= Arthur A. Oliner =

American physicist and electrical engineer

Arthur Aaron Oliner
- Born: March 5, 1921; Shanghai, China
- Died: September 9, 2013 (aged 92); Lexington, Massachusetts, U.S.
- Citizenship: United States
- Education: Brooklyn College; Cornell University
- Known for: Leaky wave antennas; Guided waves
- Spouse: Frieda Oliner
- Awards: IEEE Heinrich Hertz Medal (2000)
- Scientific career
- Fields: Microwave engineering
- Workplaces: New York University-Polytechnic
- Thesis: I. Phase-sensitive Detectors: II. An Investigation of an Air Speed Indicator (1946)

Arthur Aaron Oliner (March 5, 1921 – September 9, 2013) was an American physicist and electrical engineer, who was professor emeritus at department of electrical and computer engineering at New York University-Polytechnic. Best known for his contributions to engineering electromagnetics and antenna theory, he is regarded as a pioneer of leaky wave theory and leaky wave antennas.

== Biography ==
Arthur Aaron Oliner was born on March 5, 1921, in Shanghai, China. He received an undergraduate degree from Brooklyn College and Ph.D. from Cornell University in 1941 and 1946 respectively, with both being in physics. In 1946, he joined Microwave Research Institute at New York University's school of engineering, then known as the Polytechnic Institute of Brooklyn. In 1965, he went on to a sabbatical at École normale supérieure in Paris, France, under a Guggenheim Fellowship. Becoming a full professor in 1957, Oliner acted as the head of the institute's department of electrical engineering in between 1966 and 1974. In addition, he was the director of the Microwave Research Institute from 1967 until 1982. He retired from New York University in 1990. He died on September 9, 2013, in Lexington, Massachusetts. He was survived by two children, four grandchildren, and one great-grandchild; his wife Frieda, died in 2013.

Oliner was a Fellow of AAAS and a Life Fellow of IEEE. In 1991, he was elected to the National Academy of Engineering for his "contributions to the theory of guided electromagnetic waves and antennas." He was a recipient of the IEEE Heinrich Hertz Medal (2000) and Distinguished Educator Award of the Microwave Theory and Techniques Society, of which he was an Honorary Life Member.

During his career, Oliner was also employed as an engineering consultant for IBM, Boeing, Raytheon Technologies, Hughes Aircraft Company and Rockwell International. He was the founder of Merrimac Industries, and served on its board of directors from 1962 until its acquisition by Crane Aerospace in 2010.

== Research ==
Oliner's research work encompassed a wide array of topics in microwave field theory, including but not limited to equivalent networks and circuits, precision measurements, leaky and surface waves on waveguides, traveling-wave antennas, phased arrays and periodic structures. He was also involved in the research of surface acoustic waveguides and integrated optics. His work with L. O. Goldstone pioneered the theory behind leaky wave antennas. Following his retirement in 1990, he was also involved in the research of striplines and microstrips. In the early 2000s, Oliner also contributed to the understanding of plasmonic phenomena within a leaky wave context.

== Selected publications ==
Journal articles

- Goldstone, L.; Oliner, A. (1959). "Leaky-wave antennas I: Rectangular waveguides". IRE Transactions on Antennas and Propagation. 7 (4): 307–319. Bibcode:1959ITAP....7..307G. doi:10.1109/TAP.1959.1144702.
- Tamir, T.; Oliner, A.A. (1963). "Guided complex waves. Part 1: Fields at an interface". Proceedings of the Institution of Electrical Engineers. 110 (2): 310–324. doi:10.1049/piee.1963.0044.
- Hessel, A.; Oliner, A. A. (1965). "A new theory of Wood's anomalies on optical gratings". Applied Optics. 4 (10): 1275–1297. Bibcode:1965ApOpt...4.1275H. doi:10.1364/AO.4.001275.
- Peng, Song-Tsuen; Oliner, A.A. (1981). "Guidance and leakage properties of a class of open dielectric waveguides: Part I - Mathematical formulations". IEEE Transactions on Microwave Theory and Techniques. 29 (8): 843–855. doi:10.1109/TMTT.1981.1130465.
- Oliner, A. A. (1987). "Leakage from higher modes on microstrip line with application to antennas". Radio Science. 22 (6): 907–912. Bibcode:1987RaSc...22..907O. doi:10.1029/RS022i006p00907.
- Jackson, D.R.; Oliner, A.A. (1988). "A leaky-wave analysis of the high-gain printed antenna configuration". IEEE Transactions on Antennas and Propagation . 36 (7): 905–910. Bibcode:1988ITAP...36..905J. doi:10.1109/8.7194.

Books

- Oliner, A. A., ed. (1978). Acoustic Surface Waves. Springer-Verlag. ISBN 978-3-662-30917-9.
- Sarkar, T. K.; Mailloux, Robert; Oliner, Arthur A.; Salazar-Palma, Magdalena; Sengupta, Dipak L. (2006). History of Wireless. Wiley-IEEE Press. ISBN 978-0471718147.
