= Harold Beverage =

American electrical engineer

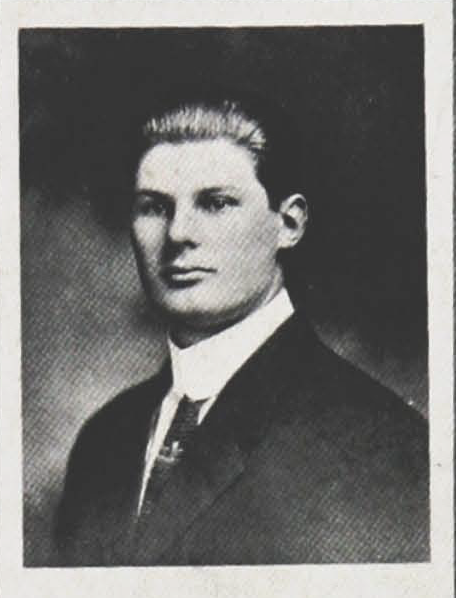
- 1915 yearbook photo
- Born: 14 October 1893; North Haven, Maine, US
- Died: 27 January 1993 (aged 99); Port Jefferson, New York, US
- Education: University of Maine
- Awards: IEEE Medal of Honor (1945)
- Scientific career
- Fields: Electrical engineering
- Workplaces: RCA

Harold Henry "Bev" Beverage (October 14, 1893 – January 27, 1993) was an American inventor and researcher in electrical engineering. He is known for his invention and development of the wave antenna, which came to be known as the Beverage antenna. Less widely known (outside of the community of science history researchers) is that Bev was a pioneer of radio engineering and his engineering research paralleled the development of radio transmission technology throughout his professional career with significant contributions not only in the field of radio frequency antennas but also radio frequency propagation and systems engineering.

== Biography ==
Harold Beverage was born on October 14, 1893, in North Haven, Maine, to Fremont Beverage and his wife, Lottie Smith. He received a B.S. in electrical engineering from the University of Maine in 1915, and went to work for General Electric Company the following year as a radio-laboratory assistant to Dr. Ernst Alexanderson. In 1920, he was placed in charge of developing receivers for transoceanic communications at the Radio Corporation of America in Riverhead, New York. Three years later, at the age of 30, he received the IRE Morris N. Liebmann Memorial Prize "for his work on directional antennas."

RCA named Beverage chief research engineer of communications in 1929, a position he held until 1940. At that time, he was promoted to vice president in charge of research and development at RCA Communications Inc., a subsidiary of the Radio Corporation of America. Beverage retired in 1958 from that position and as director of radio research, but continued to work in communications as a consultant.

In 1938, the Radio Club of America presented him with its Armstrong Medal for his work in the development of antenna systems. The Beverage antenna, the citation said, was "the precursor of wave antennas of all types." Beverage was awarded the IRE Medal of Honor in 1945, "In recognition of his achievements in radio research and invention, of his practical applications of engineering developments that greatly extended and increased the efficiency of domestic and world-wide radio communications and of his devotion to the affairs of the Institute of Radio Engineers." In awarding him its AIEE Lamme Medal in 1956 the American Institute of Electrical Engineers cited him "for his pioneering and outstanding engineering achievements in the conception and application of principles basic to progress in national and worldwide radio communications."

Beverage died on January 27, 1993, at the John T. Mather Hospital in Port Jefferson, L.I. He was 99, and lived in Stony Brook, New York.

== Patents ==
- U.S. patent 1,381,089 Jun 7, 1921 Radio Receiving System - the Beverage antenna
- U.S. patent 1,434,984 Nov 7, 1922 Radio Receiving System - the bidirectional Beverage antenna
- U.S. patent 1,434,985 Nov 7, 1922 Radio Receiving System - using a Beverage antenna with multiple receivers
- U.S. patent 1,434,986 Nov 7, 1922 Radio Receiving System - a Beverage antenna with selective circuits to eliminate interference from adjacent wavelengths
- U.S. patent 1,487,308 Mar 18, 1924 Radio Receiving System - improvements to the directivity of the Beverage Antenna
- U.S. patent 1,697,945 Jan 8, 1929 Artificial transmission lines for phasing multiple antennas
- U.S. patent 1,989,965 Aug. 5, 1931 Means for testing recorded sound—automatic check film
- U.S. patent 1,819,589 Aug. 18, 1931 H.H.B. % H.O. Peterson—Means for eliminating fading on high frequencies (filed1/2/26)
- U.S. patent 1,849,608 Mar. 15, 1932 Frequency modulate or mark/space for AGC (automatic gain control)
- U.S. patent 1,874,865 Aug. 30, 1932 Acoustic combining system - mix reflections
- U.S. patent 1,874,866 Aug. 30, 1932 Method for eliminating fading—basic rectifier telegraph
- U.S. patent 1,888,065 Nov. 15, 1932 Differential volume control for diversity artificial line
- U.S. patent 1,917,290 Jul. 11, 1933 H.H.B. & H.O. Peterson—Rotating switch, diversity
- U.S. patent 1,917,291 Jul. 11, 1933 H.H.B. & H.O. Peterson—Artificial line pickup delay, diversity
- U.S. patent 1,962,169 Jun 12, 1934 Device for reducing the effects of static or fading
- U.S. patent 1,967,604 Jul 24, 1934 Aerial System - to be used adjacent to local noise sources
- U.S. patent 1,987,889 Jan. 15, 1935 H.H.B. & H.O. Peterson—Means for elimination of fading on short wavelengths
- U.S. patent 1,989,965 Feb 5, 1935 Method of testing recorded sound
- U.S. patent 2,014,518 Sept. 17, 1935 Remote control system for relay stations
- U.S. patent RE19784 Dec. 10, 1935 Aerial system—balanced bridge to reduce engine ignition noise of aircraft
- U.S. patent 2,025,190 Dec. 24, 1935 Multiplex signaling—commutator and frequency change for multiplex
- U.S. patent 2,028,860 Jan. 28, 1936 Receiving system-rectifier high frequency for C.W. Hansell electrolytic recorder
- U.S. patent 2,034,738 Mar. 24, 1936 Radio telegraph repeater—electronic, no relays
- U.S. patent 2,067,432 Jan. 12, 1937 Radio communication—frequency diversity
- U.S. patent 2,069,813 Feb. 9, 1937 H.H.B. & H.O. Peterson—Fading eliminator—different beat notes
- U.S. patent 2,070,418 Feb. 6, 1937 Multiplex cable code with diversity receivers
- U.S. patent 2,076,361 Apr. 6, 1937 Crystal oscillator monitor for centralized control
- U.S. patent 2,081,730 May 25, 1937 Television system—AGC based on density of film
- U.S. patent 2,084,760 June 22, 1937 System for radio spectrography, horizontal sync on oscillograph
- U.S. patent 2,095,050 Oct, 5, 1937 Signaling-space between carrier and sidebands, phone
- U.S. patent 2,106,806 Feb 1, 1938 Relay system - Ultra short radio waves
- U.S. patent 2,112,877 Aug. 5, 1938 Centralized control relay stations
- U.S. patent 2,138,134 Nov 29, 1938 Phasing and spacing antennas to eliminate undesired reflected rays
- U.S. patent 2,144,215 Jan, 17, 1939 Electrical energy measuring system frequency modulation
- U.S. patent 2,146,301 Feb 7, 1939 Warren Knotts & H.H.B. -- Frequency assignments for relay stations
- U.S. patent 2,173,156 Sept. 191 1939 Amplitude modulation reception—change to phase modulation
- U.S. patent 2,247,743 Jul 1, 1941 Broadband Uni-directional Shortwave Antenna
- U.S. patent 2,255,374 Sept 9, 1941 System for noise reduction - noise random, signal in phase
- U.S. patent 2,271,909 Feb. 3, 1942 Ultra short wave noise elimination—balance local noise vertical suppressor
- U.S. patent 2,405,991 Aug 20, 1946 Secrecy system for multiplex telegraphy
- U.S. patent 2,416,791 Mar 4, 1947 Radio receiver system for UHF frequencies that removes unintentional frequency modulation from a received signal
- U.S. patent 2,487,513 Nov 8, 1949 Radio Relaying System - frequency selection for a chain of relay stations
