= Leaky mode =

A leaky mode or tunneling mode in an optical fiber or other waveguide is a mode having an electric field that decays monotonically for a finite distance in the transverse direction but becomes oscillatory everywhere beyond that finite distance. Such a mode gradually "leaks" out of the waveguide as it travels down it, producing attenuation even if the waveguide is perfect in every respect. In order for a leaky mode to be definable as a mode, the relative amplitude of the oscillatory part (the leakage rate) must be sufficiently small that the mode substantially maintains its shape as it decays.

Leaky modes correspond to leaky rays in the terminology of geometric optics. The propagation of light through optical fibre can take place via meridional rays or skew rays. These skew rays suffer only partial reflection while meridional rays are completely guided. Thus the modes allowing propagation of skew rays are called leaky modes. Some optical power is lost into clad due to these modes.
