= Traveling-wave antenna =

Telecommunication

In radio and telecommunication, a traveling-wave antenna is a class of antenna that uses a traveling wave on a guiding structure as the main radiating mechanism. Its distinguishing feature is that the radio-frequency current that generates the radio waves travels through the antenna in one direction, hence any one wave-front makes only a single pass across the length of the antenna. This is in contrast to a resonant antenna, such as the monopole or dipole, in which the antenna acts as a resonator, with radio currents traveling in both directions, bouncing back and forth between the ends of the antenna. An advantage of traveling wave antennas is that since they are not resonant they often have a wider bandwidth than resonant antennas. Common types of traveling wave antenna are the Beverage antenna, axial-mode helical antenna, and rhombic antenna.

Traveling-wave antennas fall into two general categories: slow-wave antennas, and fast-wave antennas. Fast-wave antennas are often referred to as leaky wave antenna.

== See also ==
- Axial mode helical antenna
- Beverage antenna
- Dipole and monopole antennas
- Leaky wave antenna
- Rhombic antenna
- Shortwave broadband antenna
