= Antenna (radio) =

Device that transmits and receives radio waves

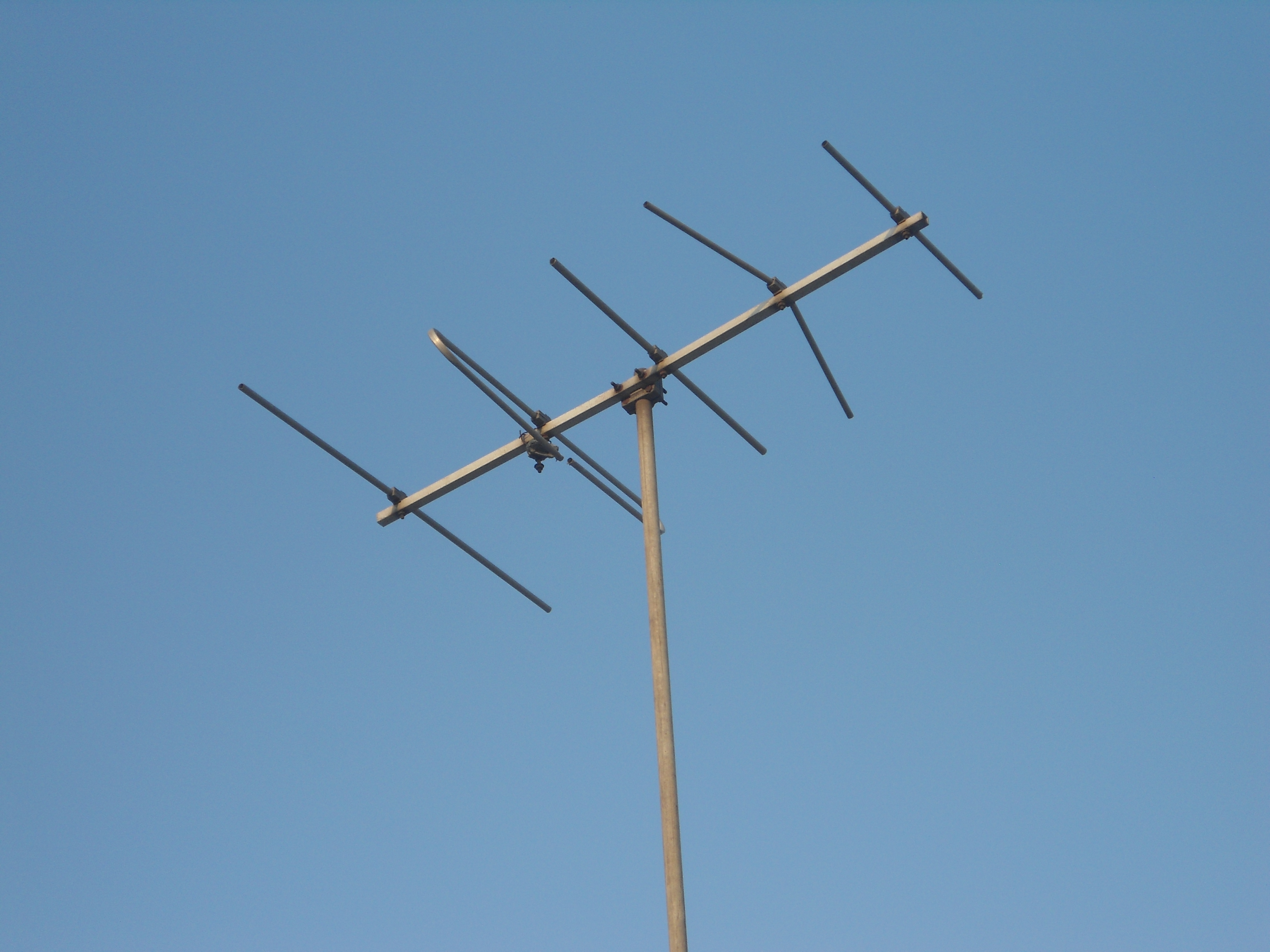
- A television antenna used for reception of television signals in VHF
- Component type: Passive
- Inventor: Heinrich Hertz
- Invention year: 1886
- First produced: 1898
- First produced by: Marconi Company

Electronic symbol

In radio-frequency engineering, an antenna (American English) or aerial (British English) is a structure used to convert alternating electric currents into radio waves for transmission, and to convert radio waves back into electric currents for reception. It is the interface between radio waves propagating through space and electric currents moving in metal conductors, used with a transmitter or receiver. In transmission, a radio transmitter supplies an electric current to the antenna's terminals, and the antenna radiates the energy from the current as electromagnetic waves (radio waves). In reception, an antenna intercepts some of the power of a radio wave in order to produce an electric current at its terminals, that is applied to a receiver to be amplified. Antennas are essential components of all radio equipment.

An antenna is an array of conductor segments (elements), electrically connected to the receiver or transmitter. Antennas can be designed to transmit and receive radio waves in all horizontal directions equally (omnidirectional antennas), or preferentially in a particular direction (directional, or high-gain, or "beam" antennas). An antenna may include components not connected to the transmitter, parabolic reflectors, horns, or parasitic elements, which serve to direct the radio waves into a beam or other desired radiation pattern. Strong directivity and good transmitting efficiency when transmitting are hard to achieve with antennas whose dimensions are much smaller than a half wavelength.

The first antennas were built in 1886 by German physicist Heinrich Hertz in his pioneering experiments to prove the existence of electromagnetic waves predicted by the 1867 electromagnetic theory of James Clerk Maxwell. Hertz placed dipole antennas at the focal point of parabolic reflectors for both transmitting and receiving. Starting in 1895, Guglielmo Marconi began development of antennas practical for long-distance wireless telegraphy and opened a factory in Chelmsford, England, to manufacture his invention in 1898.

Half-wave dipole antenna receiving a radio wave: The electric field (E) of the wave excites oscillating currents (black arrows) in the receiver.

Antenna radiating radio waves: The transmitter applies an alternating current (red arrows) to the rods, which charges them alternately positive and negative, emitting loops of electric field. The arrows of the loops get reversed each time the current changes polarity.

== Terminology ==
Electronic symbol for an antenna

The words antenna and aerial are used interchangeably. Occasionally the equivalent term "aerial" is used to specifically mean an elevated horizontal wire antenna. The origin of the word antenna relative to wireless apparatus is attributed to Italian radio pioneer Guglielmo Marconi. In the summer of 1895, Marconi began testing his wireless system outdoors on his father's estate near Bologna and soon began to experiment with long wire "aerials" suspended from a pole. In Italian a tent pole is known as l'antenna centrale, and the pole with the wire was simply called l'antenna. Until then wireless radiating transmitting and receiving elements were known simply as "terminals". Because of his prominence, Marconi's use of the word antenna spread among wireless researchers and enthusiasts, and later to the general public.

Antenna may refer broadly to an entire assembly including support structure, enclosure (if any), etc., in addition to the actual RF current-carrying components. A receiving antenna may include not only the passive metal receiving elements, but also an integrated preamplifier or mixer, especially at and above microwave frequencies.

== Overview ==
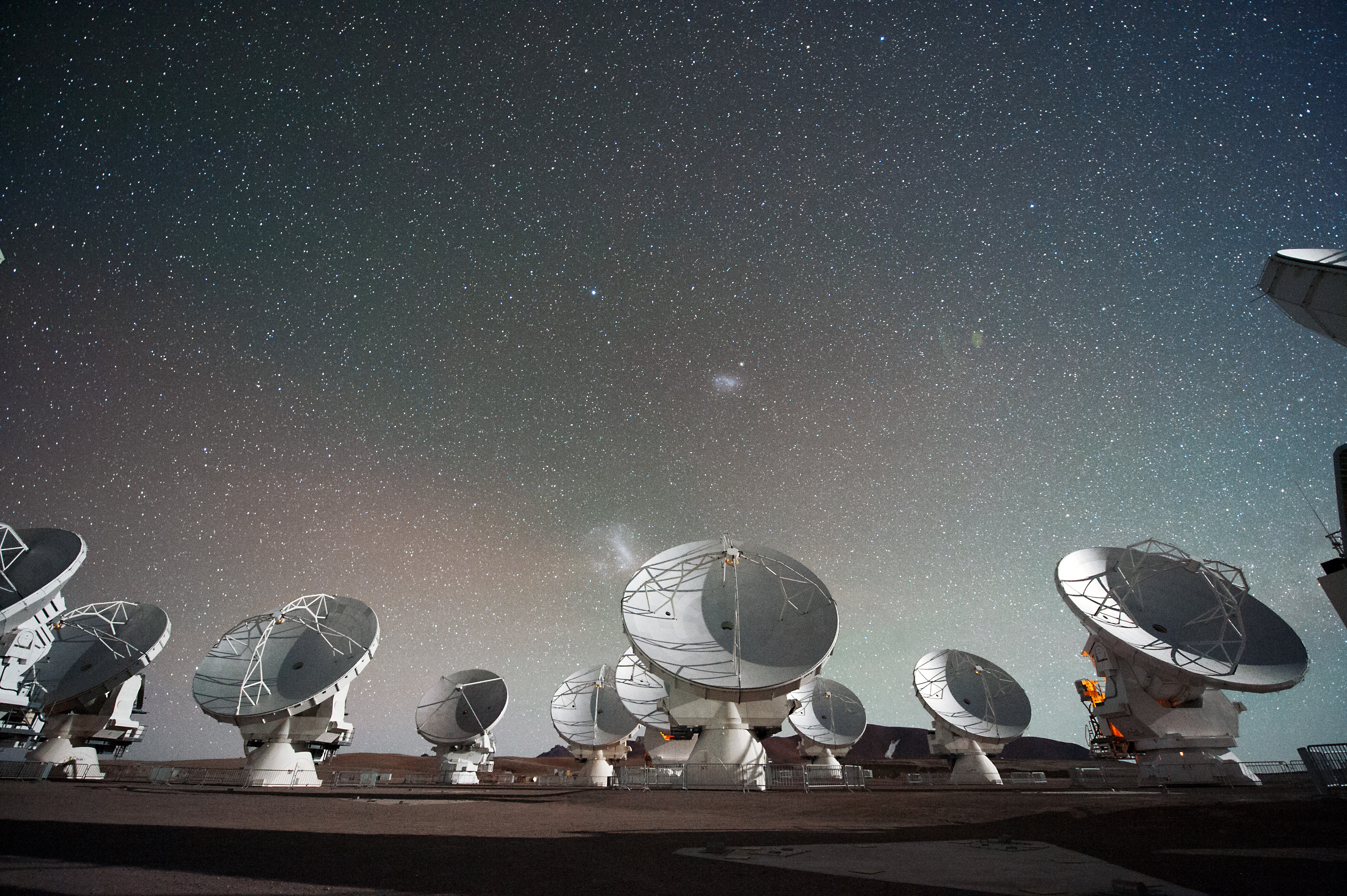
Antennas of the Atacama Large Millimeter/submillimeter Array

Antennas are required by any radio receiver or transmitter to couple its electrical connection to the electromagnetic field. Radio waves are electromagnetic waves that carry signals through space at the speed of light; in free space they propagate without material absorption, apart from geometric spreading loss.

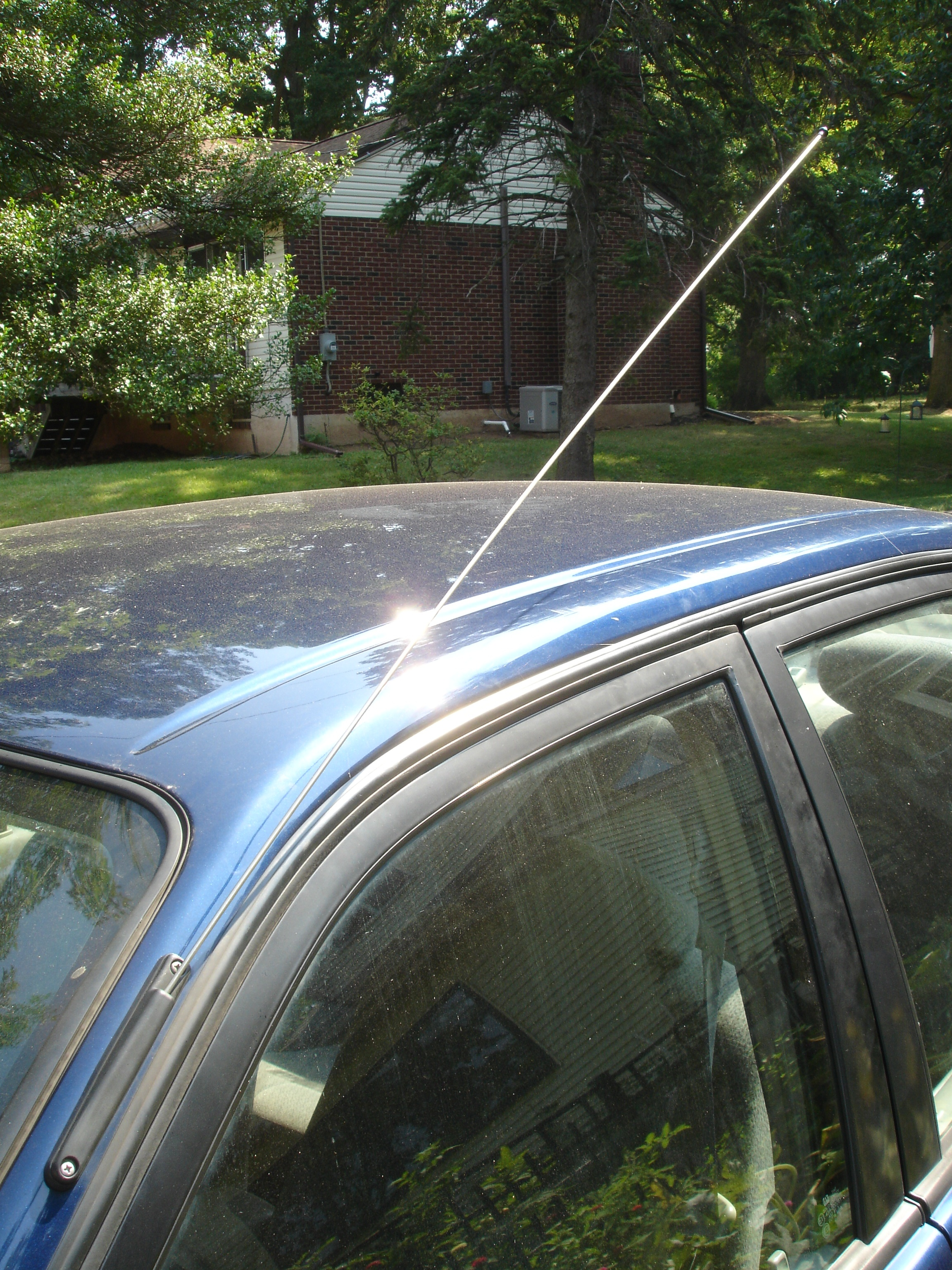
An automobile's whip antenna, a common example of an omnidirectional antenna

Antennas can be classified as omnidirectional, radiating energy approximately equally in all horizontal directions, or directional, where radio waves are concentrated in some direction(s). A so-called beam antenna is unidirectional – designed for maximum response in the direction of the remote station they are aligned with – whereas many other antennas are intended to respond to stations in several directions, but are not truly omnidirectional. Since antennas obey reciprocity, the same radiation pattern applies both to transmission as well as reception of radio waves. A hypothetical antenna that radiates equally in all directions (vertical as well as all horizontal angles) is called an isotropic radiator; however, exact uniformity cannot be accomplished in practical antennas, and is only rarely desired (e.g. emergency antennas for spacecraft). Rather, for most terrestrial communications, there is an advantage in reducing radiation toward the sky or ground in favor of horizontal direction(s). A dipole antenna oriented horizontally sends no energy in the direction of the center-line of the conductor – the silent direction is called the antenna's null – but with no obstructions is usable in most other directions; at and below its first resonant frequency, the strongest radiation is in all unobstructed directions perpendicular to the single pair of opposing wires. Several dipole elements of slightly different lengths can be stacked in parallel, into an antenna array such as the Yagi–Uda in order to focus their radiation into a single horizontal direction, perpendicular to the stack, thus termed a beam antenna.

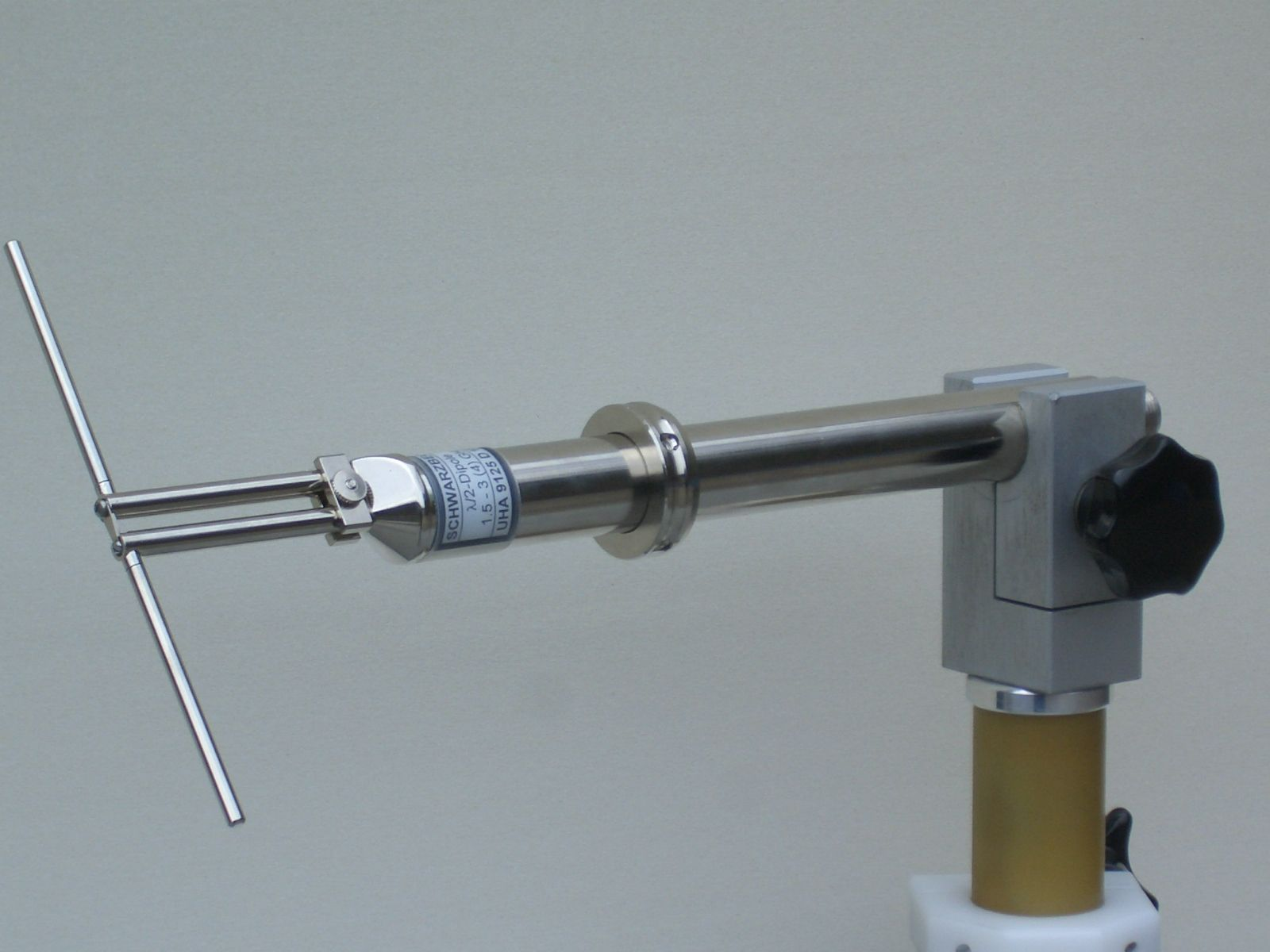
Half-wave dipole antenna

A half‑wave dipole antenna is a balanced element, with equal and opposite voltages and currents at its two terminals, and serves as a simple reference for analyzing many other antenna designs. The vertical antenna is a monopole antenna, not balanced with respect to ground. The ground (or any large conductive surface) plays the role of the second conductor of a monopole. Since monopole antennas rely on a conductive surface, they may be mounted with a ground plane to approximate the effect of being mounted on the Earth's surface.

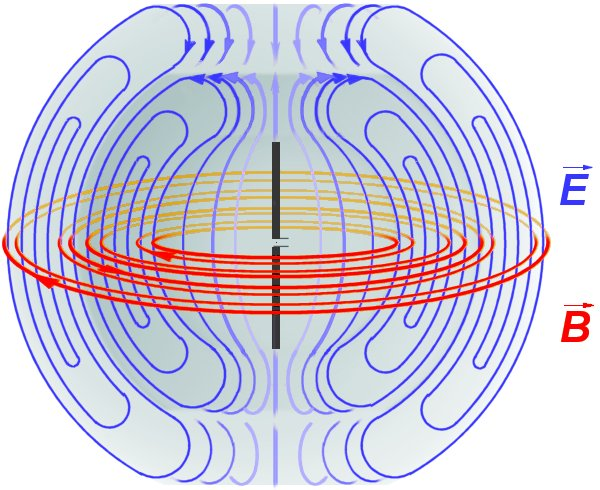
Diagram of the electric fields (blue) and magnetic fields (red) radiated by a dipole antenna ( black rods) during transmission

More complex antennas increase the directivity of the antenna. Additional elements in the antenna structure, which need not be directly connected to the receiver or transmitter, increase its directionality. Antenna "gain" describes the concentration of radiated power into a particular solid angle of space. Unlike amplifier gain, which generally implies a net increase in signal power, antenna gain reflects a redistribution of power so that more is radiated in some directions and less in others, without increasing the total radiated power. Unlike amplifiers, antennas are electrically "passive" devices which conserve total power, and there is no increase in total power above that delivered from the power source (the transmitter), only improved distribution of that fixed total.

A phased array consists of two or more simple antennas which are connected together through an electrical network. This often involves a number of parallel dipole antennas with a certain spacing. Depending on the relative phase introduced by the network, the same combination of dipole antennas can operate as a "broadside array" (directional normal to a line connecting the elements) or as an "end-fire array" (directional along the line connecting the elements). Antenna arrays may employ any basic (omnidirectional or weakly directional) antenna type, such as dipole, loop or slot antennas. These elements are often identical.

Log‑periodic and other frequency‑independent antennas employ self‑similar structures in order to operate effectively over a wide range of frequencies (i.e., with wide bandwidth). The most familiar example is the log-periodic dipole array which can be seen as a number (typically 10 to 20) of connected dipole elements with progressive lengths in an endfire array making it rather directional; it finds use especially as a rooftop antenna for television reception. On the other hand, a Yagi–Uda antenna (or simply "Yagi"), with a somewhat similar appearance, has only one dipole element with an electrical connection; the other parasitic elements interact with the electromagnetic field in order to realize a highly directional antenna but with a narrow bandwidth.

Even greater directionality can be obtained using aperture antennas such as the parabolic reflector or horn antenna. Since high directivity in an antenna depends on it being large compared to the wavelength, highly directional antennas (thus with high antenna gain) become more practical at higher frequencies (UHF and above).

At low frequencies (such as AM broadcast), arrays of vertical towers are used to achieve directionality and they will occupy large areas of land. For reception, a long Beverage antenna can have significant directivity. For non directional portable use, a short vertical antenna or small loop antenna works well, with the main design challenge being that of impedance matching. With a vertical antenna a loading coil at the base of the antenna may be employed to cancel the reactive component of impedance; small loop antennas are tuned with parallel capacitors for this purpose.

An antenna lead-in is the transmission line, or feed line, that connects the antenna to a transmitter or receiver. The "antenna feed" may refer to all components connecting the antenna to the transmitter or receiver, such as an impedance matching network in addition to the transmission line. In a so-called "aperture antenna", such as a horn or parabolic dish, the "feed" may also refer to a basic radiating antenna embedded in the entire system of reflecting elements (normally at the focus of the parabolic dish or at the throat of a horn) which could be considered the one active element in that antenna system. A microwave antenna may also be fed directly from a waveguide in place of a (conductive) transmission line.

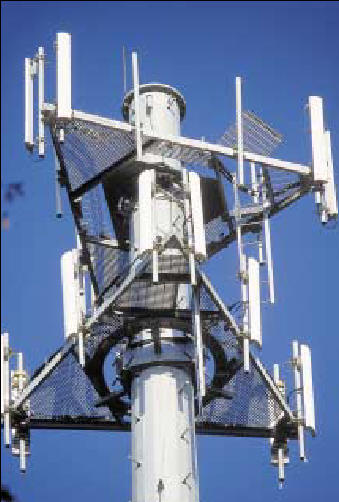
Cell phone base station antennas

An antenna counterpoise, or ground plane, is a structure of conductive material which improves or substitutes for the ground. It may be connected to or insulated from the natural ground. In a monopole antenna, this aids in the function of the natural ground, particularly where variations (or limitations) of the characteristics of the natural ground interfere with its proper function. Such a structure is normally connected to the return connection of an unbalanced transmission line such as the shield of a coaxial cable.

An electromagnetic wave refractor in some aperture antennas is a component which due to its shape and position functions to selectively delay or advance portions of the electromagnetic wavefront passing through it. The refractor alters the spatial characteristics of the wave on one side relative to the other side. It can, for instance, bring the wave to a focus or alter the wave front in other ways, generally in order to maximize the directivity of the antenna system. This is the radio equivalent of an optical lens.

An antenna coupling network is a passive network (generally a combination of inductive and capacitive circuit elements) used for impedance matching in between the antenna and the transmitter or receiver. This may be used to minimize losses on the feed line, by reducing transmission line's standing wave ratio, and to present the transmitter or receiver with a standard resistive impedance needed for its optimum operation. The feed point location(s) is selected, and antenna elements electrically similar to tuner components may be incorporated in the antenna structure itself, to improve the match.

== Reciprocity ==
It is a fundamental property of antennas that most of the electrical characteristics of an antenna, such as those described in the next section (e.g. gain, radiation pattern, impedance, bandwidth, resonant frequency and polarization), are the same whether the antenna is transmitting or receiving. The "receiving pattern" (sensitivity to incoming signals as a function of direction) of an antenna used for reception is identical to its radiation pattern when it is driven and functions as a radiator, even though the current and voltage distributions on the antenna itself differ between receiving and transmitting. This equivalence follows reciprocity theorem of electromagnetics. Therefore, in discussions of antenna properties no distinction is usually made between receiving and transmitting terminology, and the antenna can be viewed as either transmitting or receiving, whichever is more convenient.

A necessary condition for the aforementioned reciprocity property is that the materials in the antenna and transmission medium are linear and reciprocal. Reciprocal (or bilateral) means that the material has the same response to an electric current or magnetic field in one direction, as it has to the field or current in the opposite direction. Most materials used in antennas meet these conditions, but some microwave antennas use high-tech components such as isolators and circulators, made of nonreciprocal materials such as ferrite. These can be used to give the antenna a different behavior on receiving than it has on transmitting, which can be useful in applications like radar.

== Resonant antennas ==
The majority of antenna designs are based on the resonance principle. This relies on the behaviour of moving electrons, which reflect off surfaces where the dielectric constant changes, in a fashion similar to the way light reflects when optical properties change. In these designs, the reflective surface is created by the end of a conductor, normally a thin metal wire or rod, which in the simplest case has a feed point at one end where it is connected to a transmission line. The conductor, or element, is aligned with the electrical field of the desired signal, normally meaning it is perpendicular to the line from the antenna to the source (or receiver in the case of a broadcast antenna).

The radio signal's electric component induces a voltage in the conductor. This causes an electrical current to begin flowing in the direction of the signal's instantaneous field. When the resulting current reaches the end of the conductor, it reflects, which is equivalent to a 180 degree change in phase. If the conductor is 1 /4 of a wavelength long, current from the feed point will undergo 90 degree phase change by the time it reaches the end of the conductor, reflect through 180 degrees, and then another 90 degrees as it travels back. That means it has undergone a total 360 degree phase change, returning it to the original signal. The current in the element thus adds to the current being created from the source at that instant. This process creates a standing wave in the conductor, with the maximum current at the feed.

The ordinary half-wave dipole is probably the most widely used antenna design. This consists of two 1 /4 wavelength elements arranged end-to-end, and lying along essentially the same axis (or collinear), each feeding one side of a two-conductor transmission wire. The physical arrangement of the two elements places them 180 degrees out of phase, which means that at any given instant one of the elements is driving current into the transmission line while the other is pulling it out. The monopole antenna is essentially one half of the half-wave dipole, a single 1 /4 wavelength element with the other side connected to ground or an equivalent ground plane (or counterpoise). Monopoles, which are one-half the size of a dipole, are common for long-wavelength radio signals where a dipole would be impractically large. Another common design is the folded dipole which consists of two (or more) half-wave dipoles placed side by side and connected at their ends but only one of which is driven.

The standing wave forms with this desired pattern at the design operating frequency, f_{o}, and antennas are normally designed to be this size. However, feeding that element with 3 f_{o} (whose wavelength is 1 /3 that of f_{o}) will also lead to a standing wave pattern. Thus, an antenna element is also resonant when its length is 3 /4 of a wavelength. This is true for all odd multiples of 1 /4 wavelength. This allows some flexibility of design in terms of antenna lengths and feed points. Antennas used in such a fashion are known to be harmonically operated. Resonant antennas usually use a linear conductor (or element), or pair of such elements, each of which is about a quarter of the wavelength in length (an odd multiple of quarter wavelengths will also be resonant). Antennas that are required to be small compared to the wavelength sacrifice efficiency and cannot be very directional. Since wavelengths are so small at higher frequencies (UHF, microwaves) trading off performance to obtain a smaller physical size is usually not required.

=== Current and voltage distribution ===
Standing waves on a half-wave dipole driven at its resonant frequency. The waves are shown graphically by bars of color (red for voltage, V and blue for current, I) whose width is proportional to the amplitude of the quantity at the corresponding point on the antenna.

The quarter-wave elements imitate a series-resonant electrical element due to the standing wave present along the conductor. At the resonant frequency, the standing wave has a current peak and voltage node (minimum) at the feed. In electrical terms, this means that at that position, the element has minimum impedance magnitude, generating the maximum current for minimum voltage. This is the ideal situation, because it produces the maximum output for the minimum input, producing the highest possible efficiency. Contrary to an ideal (lossless) series-resonant circuit, a finite resistance remains (corresponding to the relatively small voltage at the feed-point) due to the antenna's resistance to radiating, as well as any conventional electrical losses from producing heat.

Recall that a current will reflect when there are changes in the electrical properties of the material. In order to efficiently transfer the received signal into the transmission line, it is important that the transmission line has the same impedance as its connection point on the antenna, otherwise some of the signal will be reflected backwards into the body of the antenna; likewise part of the transmitter's signal power will be reflected back to transmitter, if there is a change in electrical impedance where the feedline joins the antenna. This leads to the concept of impedance matching, the design of the overall system of antenna and transmission line so the impedance is as close as possible, thereby reducing these losses. Impedance matching is accomplished by a circuit called an antenna tuner or impedance matching network between the transmitter and antenna. The impedance match between the feedline and antenna is measured by a parameter called the standing wave ratio (SWR) on the feedline.

Consider a half-wave dipole designed to work with signals with wavelength 1 m, meaning the antenna would be approximately 50 cm from tip to tip. If the element has a length-to-diameter ratio of 1000, it will have an inherent impedance of about 63 ohms resistive. Using the appropriate transmission wire or balun, we match that resistance to ensure minimum signal reflection. Feeding that antenna with a current of 1 Ampere will require 63 Volts, and the antenna will radiate 63 Watts (ignoring losses) of radio frequency power. Now consider the case when the antenna is fed a signal with a wavelength of 1.25 m; in this case the current induced by the signal would arrive at the antenna's feedpoint out-of-phase with the signal, causing the net current to drop while the voltage remains the same. Electrically this appears to be a very high impedance. The antenna and transmission line no longer have the same impedance, and the signal will be reflected back into the antenna, reducing output. This could be addressed by changing the matching system between the antenna and transmission line, but that solution only works well at the new design frequency.

The result is that the resonant antenna will efficiently feed a signal into the transmission line only when the source signal's frequency is close to that of the design frequency of the antenna, or one of the resonant multiples. This makes resonant antenna designs inherently narrow-band: Only useful for a small range of frequencies centered around the resonance(s).

=== Electrically short antennas ===
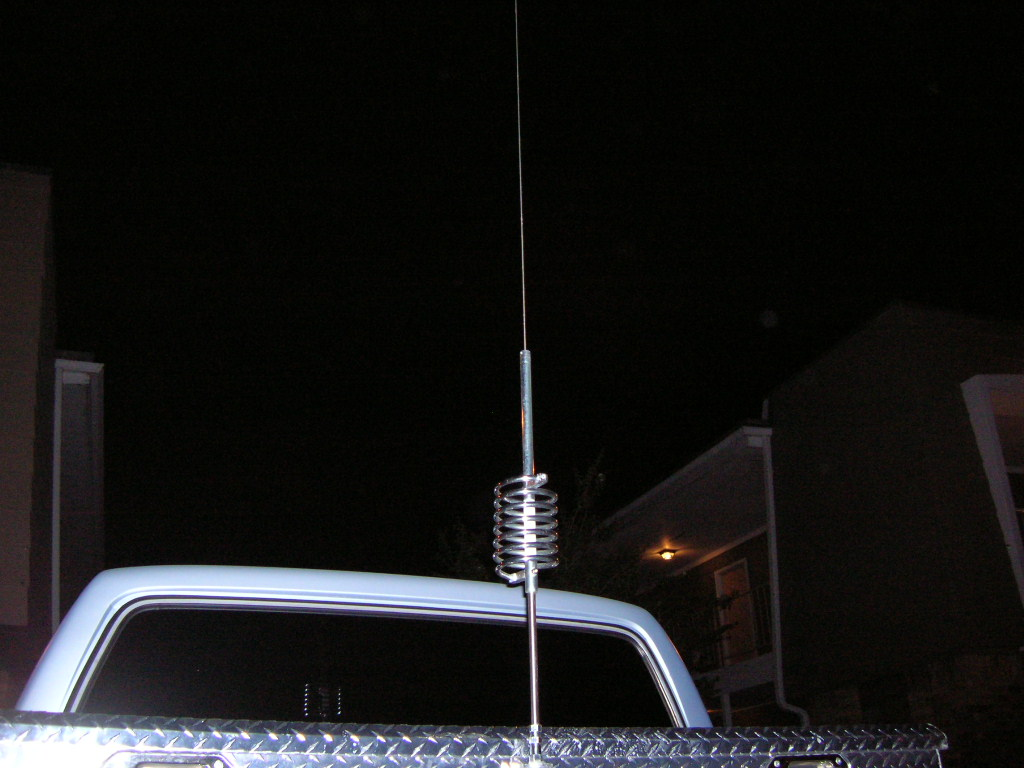
Typical center-loaded mobile CB antenna with loading coil

It is possible to use simple impedance matching techniques to allow the use of monopole or dipole antennas substantially shorter than the 1 /4 or 1 /2 wave, respectively, at which they are resonant. As these antennas are made shorter (for a given frequency) their impedance becomes dominated by a series capacitive (negative) reactance; by adding an appropriate size "loading coil" – a series inductance with equal and opposite (positive) reactance – the antenna's capacitive reactance may be cancelled leaving only a pure resistance.

Sometimes the resulting (lower) electrical resonant frequency of such a system (antenna plus matching network) is described using the concept of electrical length. An antenna operated at a lower frequency than its self‑resonant frequency is then called an electrically short antenna.

For example, at 30 MHz (10 m wavelength) a true resonant 1 /4 wave monopole would be almost 2.5 meters long, and using an antenna only 1.5 meters tall would require the addition of a loading coil. Then it may be said that the coil has lengthened the antenna to achieve an electrical length of 2.5 meters. However, the resulting resistive impedance achieved will be quite a bit lower than that of a true 1 /4 wave (resonant) monopole, often requiring further impedance matching (a transformer) to the desired transmission line. For ever shorter antennas (requiring greater "electrical lengthening") the radiation resistance plummets (approximately according to the square of the antenna length), so that the mismatch due to a net reactance away from the electrical resonance worsens. Or one could as well say that the equivalent resonant circuit of the antenna system has a higher Q factor and thus a reduced bandwidth, which can even become inadequate for the transmitted signal's spectrum. Resistive losses due to the loading coil, relative to the decreased radiation resistance, entail a reduced electrical efficiency, which can be of great concern for a transmitting antenna, but bandwidth is the major factor that sets the size of antennas at 1 MHz and lower frequencies.

=== Arrays and reflectors ===
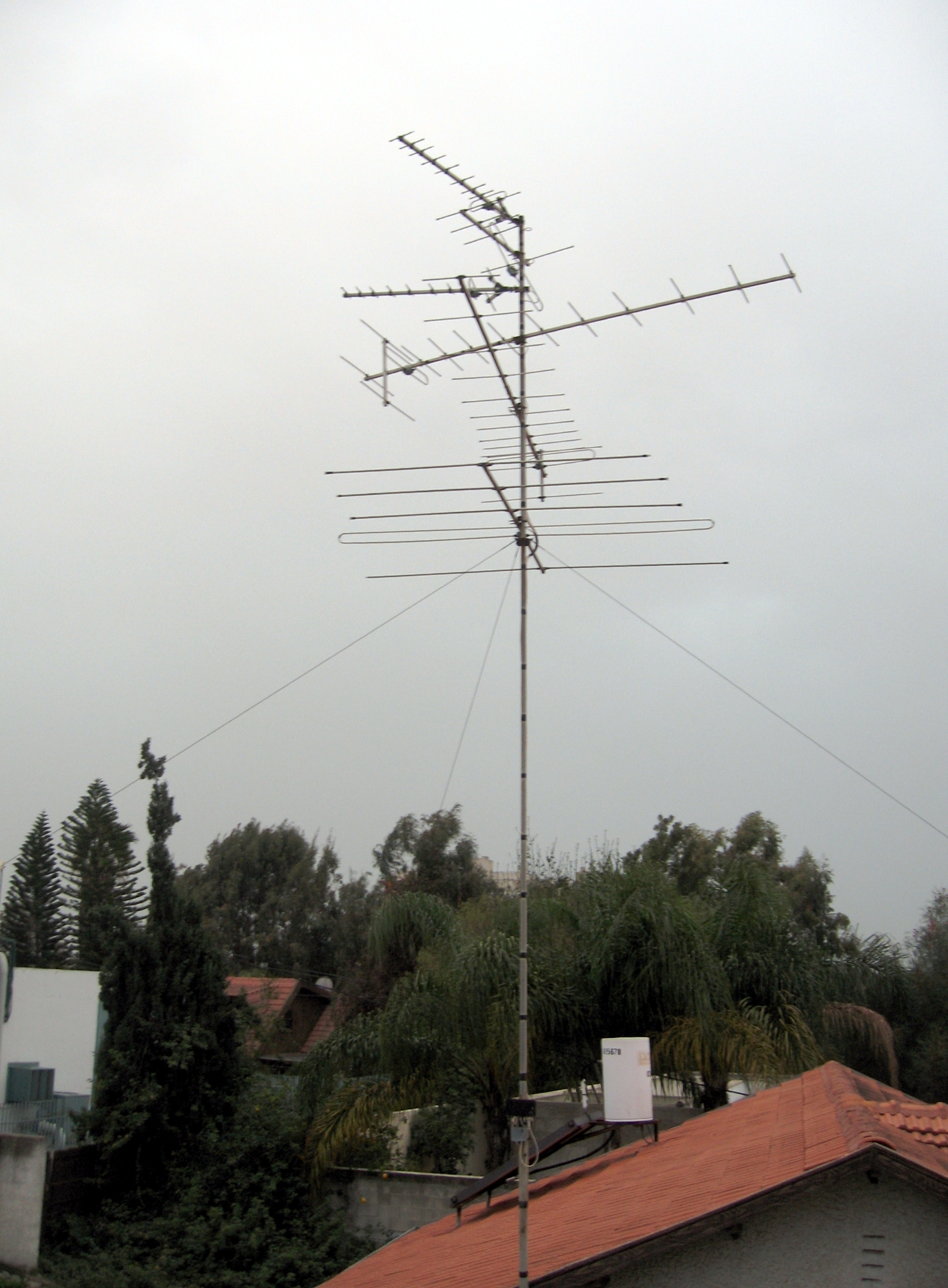
Rooftop television Yagi–Uda and log-periodic ("fishbone") array antennas like this stack are widely used at VHF and UHF frequencies.

The power flux density of the field from a transmitting antenna decreases with distance according to the inverse-square law, reflecting the geometrical spreading of the wave. For a given incoming flux, the power captured by a receiving antenna is proportional to its effective area. A half‑wave dipole, for example, has an effective area of about 0.13 λ^{2} when viewed from broadside. For an already efficient antenna design, the effective area (and thus gain) in a given direction can be increased only by reducing the gain in other directions.

If a half-wave dipole is not connected to an external circuit but rather shorted out at the feedpoint, then it becomes a resonant half-wave element which efficiently produces a standing wave in response to an impinging radio wave. Because there is no load to absorb that power, it retransmits all of that power, possibly with a phase shift which is critically dependent on the element's exact length. Thus such a conductor can be arranged in order to transmit a second copy of a transmitter's signal in order to affect the radiation pattern (and feedpoint impedance) of the element electrically connected to the transmitter. Antenna elements used in this way are known as passive radiators.

A Yagi–Uda array uses passive elements to greatly increase gain in one direction (at the expense of other directions). A number of parallel approximately half-wave elements (of very specific lengths) are situated parallel to each other, at specific positions, along a boom; the boom is only for support and not involved electrically. Only one of the elements is electrically connected to the transmitter or receiver, while the remaining elements are passive. The Yagi produces a fairly large gain (depending on the number of passive elements) and is widely used as a directional antenna with an antenna rotor to control the direction of its beam. It suffers from having a rather limited bandwidth, restricting its use to certain applications.

Rather than using one driven antenna element along with passive radiators, one can build an array antenna in which multiple elements are all driven by the transmitter through a system of power splitters and transmission lines in relative phases so as to concentrate the RF power in a single direction. What's more, a phased array can be made "steerable", that is, by changing the phases applied to each element the radiation pattern can be shifted without physically moving the antenna elements. Another common array antenna is the log-periodic dipole array which has an appearance similar to the Yagi (with a number of parallel elements along a boom) but is totally dissimilar in operation as all elements are connected electrically to the adjacent element with a phase reversal; using the log-periodic principle it obtains the unique property of maintaining its performance characteristics (gain and impedance) over a very large bandwidth.

When a radio wave hits a large conducting sheet it is reflected (with the phase of the electric field reversed) just as a mirror reflects light. Placing such a reflector behind an otherwise non-directional antenna will insure that the power that would have gone in its direction is redirected toward the desired direction, increasing the antenna's gain by a factor of at least 2. Likewise, a corner reflector can insure that all of the antenna's power is concentrated in only one quadrant of space (or less) with a consequent increase in gain. Practically speaking, the reflector need not be a solid metal sheet, but can consist of a curtain of rods aligned with the antenna's polarization; this greatly reduces the reflector's weight and wind load. Specular reflection of radio waves is also employed in a parabolic reflector antenna, in which a curved reflecting surface effects focussing of an incoming wave toward a so-called feed antenna; this results in an antenna system with an effective area comparable to the size of the reflector itself. Other concepts from geometrical optics are also employed in antenna technology, such as with the lens antenna.

== Characteristics ==
The antenna's power gain (or simply "gain") also takes into account the antenna's efficiency, and is often the primary figure of merit. Antennas are characterized by a number of performance measures which a user would be concerned with in selecting or designing an antenna for a particular application. A plot of the directional characteristics in the space surrounding the antenna is its radiation pattern.

=== Bandwidth ===
The frequency range or bandwidth over which an antenna functions well can be very wide (as in a log-periodic antenna) or narrow (as in a small loop antenna); outside this range the antenna impedance becomes a poor match to the transmission line and transmitter (or receiver). Use of the antenna well away from its design frequency affects its radiation pattern, reducing its directive gain.

Generally an antenna will not have a feed-point impedance that matches that of a transmission line; a matching network between antenna terminals and the transmission line will improve power transfer to the antenna. A non-adjustable matching network will most likely place further limits the usable bandwidth of the antenna system. It may be desirable to use tubular elements, instead of thin wires, to make an antenna; these will allow a greater bandwidth. Or, several thin wires can be grouped in a cage to simulate a thicker element. This widens the bandwidth of the resonance.

Amateur radio antennas that operate at several frequency bands which are widely separated from each other may connect elements resonant at those different frequencies in parallel. Most of the transmitter's power will flow into the resonant element while the others present a high impedance. Another solution uses traps, parallel resonant circuits which are strategically placed in breaks created in long antenna elements. When used at the trap's particular resonant frequency the trap presents a very high impedance (parallel resonance) effectively truncating the element at the location of the trap; if positioned correctly, the truncated element makes a proper resonant antenna at the trap frequency. At substantially higher or lower frequencies the trap allows the full length of the broken element to be employed, but with a resonant frequency shifted by the net reactance added by the trap.

The bandwidth characteristics of a resonant antenna element can be characterized according to its Q where the resistance involved is the radiation resistance, which represents the emission of energy from the resonant antenna to free space. The Q of a narrow band antenna can be as high as 15. On the other hand, the reactance at the same off-resonant frequency of one using thick elements is much less, consequently resulting in a Q as low as 5. These two antennas may perform equivalently at the resonant frequency, but the second antenna will perform over a bandwidth 3 times as wide as the antenna consisting of a thin conductor.

Antennas for use over much broader frequency ranges are achieved using further techniques. Adjustment of a matching network can, in principle, allow for any antenna to be matched at any frequency. Thus the small loop antenna built into most AM broadcast (medium wave) receivers has a very narrow bandwidth, but is tuned using a parallel capacitance which is adjusted according to the receiver tuning. On the other hand, log-periodic antennas are not resonant at any single frequency but can (in principle) be built to attain similar characteristics (including feedpoint impedance) over any frequency range. These are therefore commonly used (in the form of directional log-periodic dipole arrays) as television antennas.

=== Gain ===
Gain is a parameter which measures the degree of directivity of the antenna's radiation pattern. A high-gain antenna will radiate most of its power in a particular direction, while a low-gain antenna will radiate over a wide angle. The antenna gain, or power gain of an antenna is defined as the ratio of the intensity (power per unit surface area) $I$ radiated by the antenna in the direction of its maximum output, at an arbitrary distance, divided by the intensity $I_\text{iso}$ radiated at the same distance by a hypothetical isotropic antenna which radiates equal power in all directions. This dimensionless ratio is usually expressed logarithmically in decibels, these units are called decibels-isotropic (dBi)

$$G_\text{dBi} = 10\log{I \over I_\text{iso}}\,$$

A second unit used to measure gain is the ratio of the power radiated by the antenna to the power radiated by a half-wave dipole antenna $I_\text{dipole}$; these units are called decibels-dipole (dBd)

$$G_\text{dBd} = 10\log{I \over I_\text{dipole}}\,$$

Since the gain of a half-wave dipole is 2.15 dBi and the logarithm of a product is additive, the gain in dBi is just 2.15 decibels greater than the gain in dBd

$$G_\text{dBi} \approx G_\text{dBd} + 2.15\,$$

High-gain antennas have the advantage of longer range and better signal quality, but must be aimed carefully at the other antenna. An example of a high-gain antenna is a parabolic dish such as a satellite television antenna. Low-gain antennas have shorter range, but the orientation of the antenna is relatively unimportant. An example of a low-gain antenna is the whip antenna found on portable radios and cordless phones. Antenna gain should not be confused with amplifier gain, a separate parameter measuring the increase in signal power due to an amplifying device placed at the front-end of the system, such as a low-noise amplifier.

=== Effective area or aperture ===
The effective area or effective aperture of a receiving antenna expresses the portion of the power of a passing electromagnetic wave which the antenna delivers to its terminals, expressed in terms of an equivalent area. For instance, if a radio wave passing a given location has a flux of 1 pW / m^{2} (10^{−12} Watts per square meter) and an antenna has an effective area of 12 m^{2}, then the antenna would deliver 12 pW of RF power to the receiver (30 microvolts RMS at 75 ohms). Since the receiving antenna is not equally sensitive to signals received from all directions, the effective area is a function of the direction to the source.

Due to reciprocity (discussed above) the gain of an antenna used for transmitting must be proportional to its effective area when used for receiving. Consider an antenna with no loss, that is, one whose electrical efficiency is 100%. It can be shown that its effective area averaged over all directions must be equal to λ^{2}/4π, the wavelength squared divided by 4π. Gain is defined such that the average gain over all directions for an antenna with 100% electrical efficiency is equal to 1. Therefore, the effective area A_{eff} in terms of the gain G in a given direction is given by:

$$A_{\mathrm{eff}} =  {\lambda^2 \over 4 \pi} \, G$$

For an antenna with an efficiency of less than 100%, both the effective area and gain are reduced by that same amount. Therefore, the above relationship between gain and effective area still holds. These are thus two different ways of expressing the same quantity. A_{eff} is especially convenient when computing the power that would be received by an antenna of a specified gain, as illustrated by the above example.

=== Radiation pattern ===
Polar plots of the horizontal cross sections of a (virtual) Yagi–Uda antenna. The outline connects points with equal field power.

The radiation pattern of an antenna is a plot of the relative field strength of the radio waves emitted by the antenna at different angles in the far field. It is typically represented by a three-dimensional graph, or polar plots of the horizontal and vertical cross sections. The pattern of an ideal isotropic antenna, which radiates equally in all directions, would look like a sphere. Many nondirectional antennas, such as monopoles and dipoles, emit equal power in all horizontal directions, with the power dropping off at higher and lower angles; this is called an omnidirectional pattern and when plotted looks like a torus or donut.

The radiation of many antennas shows a pattern of maxima or "lobes" at various angles, separated by "nulls", angles where the radiation falls to zero. This is because the radio waves emitted by different parts of the antenna typically interfere, causing maxima at angles where the radio waves arrive at distant points in phase, and zero radiation at other angles where the radio waves arrive out of phase. In a directional antenna designed to project radio waves in a particular direction, the lobe in that direction is designed larger than the others and is called the "main lobe". The other lobes usually represent unwanted radiation and are called "sidelobes". The axis through the main lobe is called the "principal axis" or "boresight axis".

The polar radiation patterns of Yagi antennas become narrower, and their directivity (and thus gain) increases, when they are designed for a relatively narrow frequency range, as compared with wideband designs.

=== Field regions ===
The space surrounding an antenna can be divided into three concentric regions: The reactive near-field (also called the inductive near-field), the radiating near-field (Fresnel region) and the far-field (Fraunhofer) regions. These regions are useful to identify the field structure in each, although the transitions between them are gradual; there are no clear boundaries.

=== Efficiency ===
Efficiency of a transmitting antenna is the ratio of power actually radiated (in all directions) to the power absorbed by the antenna terminals. The power supplied to the antenna terminals which is not radiated is converted into heat. This is usually through loss resistance in the antenna's conductors, or loss between the reflector and feed horn of a parabolic antenna.

=== Polarization ===
The orientation and physical structure of an antenna determine the polarization of the electric field of the radio wave transmitted by it. For instance, an antenna composed of a linear conductor (such as a dipole or whip antenna) oriented vertically will result in vertical polarization; if turned on its side the same antenna's polarization will be horizontal.

In the most general case, polarization is elliptical, meaning that over each cycle the electric field vector traces out an ellipse. Two special cases are linear polarization (the ellipse collapses into a line) as discussed above, and circular polarization (in which the two axes of the ellipse are equal). In linear polarization the electric field of the radio wave oscillates along one direction. In circular polarization, the electric field of the radio wave rotates around the axis of propagation. Circular or elliptically polarized radio waves are designated as right-handed or left-handed using the "thumb in the direction of the propagation" rule. Note that for circular polarization, optical researchers use the opposite right-hand rule from the one used by radio engineers.

It is best for the receiving antenna to match the polarization of the transmitted wave for optimum reception. Otherwise there will be a loss of signal strength: when a linearly polarized antenna receives linearly polarized radiation at a relative angle of θ, then there will be a power loss of cos^{2}θ . A circularly polarized antenna can be used to equally well match vertical or horizontal linear polarizations, suffering a 3 dB signal reduction. However it will be blind to a circularly polarized signal of the opposite orientation.

=== Impedance matching ===
Maximum power transfer requires matching the impedance of an antenna system (as seen looking into the transmission line) to the complex conjugate of the impedance of the receiver or transmitter. In the case of a transmitter, however, the desired matching impedance might not exactly correspond to the dynamic output impedance of the transmitter as analyzed as a source impedance but rather the design value (typically 50 Ohms) required for efficient and safe operation of the transmitting circuitry. The intended impedance is normally resistive, but a transmitter (and some receivers) may have limited additional adjustments to cancel a certain amount of reactance, in order to "tweak" the match.

When a transmission line is used in between the antenna and the transmitter (or receiver) one generally would like an antenna system whose impedance is resistive and nearly the same as the characteristic impedance of that transmission line, in addition to matching the impedance that the transmitter (or receiver) expects. The match is sought to minimize the amplitude of standing waves (measured via the standing wave ratio; SWR) that a mismatch raises on the line, and the increase in transmission line losses it entails.

==== Antenna tuning at the antenna ====
Antenna tuning, in the strict sense of modifying the antenna itself, generally refers only to cancellation of any reactance seen at the antenna terminals, leaving only a resistive impedance which might or might not be exactly the desired impedance (that of the available transmission line).

Although an antenna may be designed to have a purely resistive feedpoint impedance (such as a dipole 97% of a half wavelength long) at just one frequency, this will very likely not be exactly true at other frequencies that the antenna is eventually used for. In most cases, in principle the physical length of the antenna can be "trimmed" to obtain a pure resistance, although this is rarely convenient. On the other hand, the addition of a contrary inductance or capacitance can be used to cancel a residual capacitive or inductive reactance, respectively, and may be more convenient than lowering and trimming or extending the antenna, then hoisting it back.

Antenna reactance may be removed using lumped elements, such as capacitors or inductors in the main path of current traversing the antenna, often near the feedpoint, or by incorporating capacitive or inductive structures into the conducting body of the antenna to cancel the feedpoint reactance – such as open-ended "spoke" radial wires, or looped parallel wires – hence genuinely tune the antenna to resonance. In addition to those reactance-neutralizing add-ons, antennas of any kind may include a transformer and / or transformer balun at their feedpoint, to change the resistive part of the impedance to more nearly match the feedline's characteristic impedance.

==== Line matching at the radio ====
Antenna tuning in the loose sense, performed by an impedance matching device (somewhat inappropriately named an "antenna tuner", or the older, more appropriate term transmatch) goes beyond merely removing reactance and includes transforming the remaining resistance to match the feedline and radio.

An additional problem is matching the remaining resistive impedance to the characteristic impedance of the transmission line: A general impedance matching network (an "antenna tuner" or ATU) will have at least two adjustable elements to correct both components of impedance. Any matching network will have both power losses and power restrictions when used for transmitting.

Commercial antennas are generally designed to approximately match standard 50 Ohm coaxial cables, at standard frequencies; the design expectation is that a matching network will be merely used to 'tweak' any residual mismatch.

==== Extreme examples of loaded small antennas ====
In some cases matching is done in a more extreme manner, not simply to cancel a small amount of residual reactance, but to resonate an antenna whose resonance frequency is quite different from the intended frequency of operation.

Short vertical "whip"
For instance, for practical reasons a "whip antenna" can be made significantly shorter than a quarter-wavelength and then resonated, using a so-called loading coil.

The physically large inductor at the base of the antenna has an inductive reactance which is the opposite of the capacitative reactance that the short vertical antenna has at the desired operating frequency. The result is a pure resistance seen at feedpoint of the loading coil; although, without further measures, the resistance will be somewhat lower than would be desired to match commercial coax.

Small "magnetic" loop
Another extreme case of impedance matching occurs when using a small loop antenna (usually, but not always, for receiving) at a relatively low frequency, where it appears almost as a pure inductor. When such an inductor is resonated via a capacitor attached in parallel across its feedpoint, the capacitor not only cancels the reactance but also greatly magnifies the very small radiation resistance of a small loop to produce a better-matched feedpoint resistance.

This is the type of antenna used in most portable AM broadcast receivers (other than car radios): The standard AM antenna is a loop of wire wound around a ferrite rod (a "loopstick antenna"). The loop is resonated by a coupled tuning capacitor, which is configured to match the receiver's tuning, in order to keep the antenna resonant at the chosen receive frequency over the AM broadcast band.

== Effect of ground ==
Ground reflections is one of the common types of multipath.

The radiation pattern and even the driving point impedance of an antenna can be influenced by the dielectric constant and especially conductivity of nearby objects. For a terrestrial antenna, the ground is usually one such object of importance. The antenna's height above the ground, as well as the electrical properties (permittivity and conductivity) of the ground, can then be important. Also, in the particular case of a monopole antenna, the ground (or an artificial ground plane) serves as the return connection for the antenna current thus having an additional effect, particularly on the impedance seen by the feed line.

When an electromagnetic wave strikes a plane surface such as the ground, part of the wave is transmitted into the ground and part of it is reflected, according to the Fresnel coefficients. If the ground is a very good conductor then almost all of the wave is reflected (180° out of phase), whereas a ground modeled as a (lossy) dielectric can absorb a large amount of the wave's power. The power remaining in the reflected wave, and the phase shift upon reflection, strongly depend on the wave's angle of incidence and polarization. The dielectric constant and conductivity (or simply the complex dielectric constant) is dependent on the soil type and is a function of frequency.

For very low frequencies to high frequencies (< 30 MHz), the ground behaves as a lossy dielectric, thus the ground is characterized both by a conductivity and permittivity (dielectric constant) which can be measured for a given soil (but is influenced by fluctuating moisture levels) or can be estimated from certain maps. At lower mediumwave frequencies the ground acts mainly as a good conductor, which AM broadcast (0.5–1.7 MHz) antennas depend on.

At frequencies between 3–30 MHz, a large portion of the energy from a horizontally polarized antenna reflects off the ground, with almost total reflection at the grazing angles important for ground wave propagation. That reflected wave, with its phase reversed, can either cancel or reinforce the direct wave, depending on the antenna height in wavelengths and elevation angle (for a sky wave).

On the other hand, vertically polarized radiation is not well reflected by the ground except at grazing incidence or over very highly conducting surfaces such as sea water. However the grazing angle reflection important for ground wave propagation, using vertical polarization, is in phase with the direct wave, providing a boost of up to 6 dB, as is detailed below.

The wave reflected by earth can be considered as emitted by the image antenna.

At VHF and above (> 30 MHz) the ground becomes a poorer reflector. However, for shortwave frequencies, especially below ~15 MHz, it remains a good reflector especially for horizontal polarization and grazing angles of incidence. That is important as these higher frequencies usually depend on horizontal line-of-sight propagation (except for satellite communications), the ground then behaving almost as a mirror.

The net quality of a ground reflection depends on the topography of the surface. When the irregularities of the surface are much smaller than the wavelength, the dominant regime is that of specular reflection, and the receiver sees both the real antenna and an image of the antenna under the ground due to reflection. But if the ground has irregularities not small compared to the wavelength, reflections will not be coherent but shifted by random phases. With shorter wavelengths (higher frequencies), this is generally the case.

Whenever both the receiving or transmitting antenna are placed at significant heights above the ground (relative to the wavelength), waves reflected specularly by the ground will travel a longer distance than direct waves, inducing a phase shift which can sometimes be significant. When a sky wave is launched by such an antenna, that phase shift is always significant unless the antenna is very close to the ground (compared to the wavelength).

== Modeling antennas with line equations ==
In the first approximation, the current in a thin antenna is distributed
exactly as in a transmission line. — Schelkunoff & Friis (1952)

The flow of current in wire antennas is identical to the solution of counter-propagating waves in a single conductor transmission line, which can be solved using the telegrapher's equations. Solutions of currents along antenna elements are more conveniently and accurately obtained by numerical methods, so transmission-line techniques have largely been abandoned for precision modelling, but they continue to be a widely used source of useful, simple approximations that describe well the impedance profiles of antennas.

Unlike transmission lines, currents in antennas contribute power to the radiated part electromagnetic field, which can be modeled using radiation resistance. (Note: Excepting full-wave loop antennas, radiation resistance is typically small (tens of Ohms) compared to the antenna element's surge impedance (hundreds of Ohms), and since dry air is a very good insulator, the antenna is often modeled as lossless: R′ = G′ = 0 . The essential loss or gain of voltage due to transmission or reception is usually inserted post-hoc, after the transmission line solutions, although it can be approximately modeled as a small value added to the loss resistance R′, at the expense of working with complex numbers.)

The end of an antenna element corresponds to an unterminated (open) end of a single-conductor transmission line, resulting in a reflected wave identical to the incident wave, with its voltage in phase with the incident wave and its current in the opposite phase (thus net zero current, where there is, after all, no further conductor). The combination of the incident and reflected wave, just as in a transmission line, forms a standing wave with a current node at the conductor's end, and a voltage node one-quarter wavelength from the end (if the element is at least that long).

In a resonant antenna, the feedpoint of the antenna is at one of those voltage nodes. Due to discrepancies from the simplified version of the transmission line model, the voltage one quarter wavelength from the current node is not exactly zero, but it is near a minimum, and small compared to the much larger voltage at the conductor's end. Hence, a feed point matching the antenna at that spot requires a relatively small voltage but large current (the currents from the two waves add in-phase there), thus a relatively low feedpoint impedance.

Feeding the antenna at other points involves a large voltage, thus a large impedance, and usually one that is primarily reactive (low power factor), which is a terrible impedance match to available transmission lines. Therefore, it is usually desired for an antenna to operate as a resonant element with each conductor having a length of one quarter wavelength (or any other odd multiples of a quarter wavelength).

For instance, a half-wave dipole has two such elements (one connected to each conductor of a balanced transmission line) about one quarter wavelength long. Depending on the conductors' diameters, a small deviation from this length is adopted in order to reach the point where the antenna current and the (small) feedpoint voltage are exactly in phase. Then the antenna presents a purely resistive impedance, and ideally one close to the characteristic impedance of an available transmission line.

Despite these useful properties, resonant antennas have the disadvantage that they achieve resonance (purely resistive feedpoint impedance) only at a fundamental frequency, and perhaps some of its harmonics, and the feedpoint resistance is larger at higher-order resonances. Therefore, resonant antennas can only achieve their good performance within a limited bandwidth, depending on the Q at the resonance.

== Mutual impedance and interaction between antennas ==
The electric and magnetic fields emanating from a driven antenna element will generally affect the voltages and currents in nearby antennas, antenna elements, or other conductors. This is particularly true when the affected conductor is a resonant element (multiple of half-wavelengths in length) at about the same frequency, as is the case where the conductors are all part of the same active or passive antenna array.

Because the affected conductors are in the near-field, one can not just treat two antennas as transmitting and receiving a signal according to the Friis transmission formula for instance, but must calculate the mutual impedance matrix which takes into account both voltages and currents (interactions through both the electric and magnetic fields). Thus using the mutual impedances calculated for a specific geometry, one can solve for the radiation pattern of a Yagi–Uda antenna or the currents and voltages for each element of a phased array. Such an analysis can also describe in detail reflection of radio waves by a ground plane or by a corner reflector and their effect on the impedance (and radiation pattern) of an antenna in its vicinity.

Often such near-field interactions are undesired and pernicious. Currents in random metal objects near a transmitting antenna will often be in poor conductors, causing loss of RF power in addition to unpredictably altering the characteristics of the antenna. By careful design, it is possible to reduce the electrical interaction between nearby conductors. For instance, the 90 degree angle in between the two dipoles composing the turnstile antenna ensures no interaction between these, allowing these to be driven independently (but actually with the same signal in quadrature phases in the turnstile antenna design).

== Antenna types ==
Antennas can be classified by operating principles or by their application. Different authorities placed antennas in narrower or broader categories. Generally these include

- Dipole and monopole antennas
- Array antennas
- Loop antennas
- Parabolic antenna
- Traveling wave antennas
- Log-periodic antenna
- Spiral antenna
- Horn antenna
- Adcock antenna
- Sector antenna
- Helical antenna

These antenna types and others are summarized in greater detail in the overview article, Antenna types, as well as in each of the linked articles in the list above, and in even more detail in articles which those link to. Antennas have also been scaled down to the nanometer scale to give arise to nanoantennas which have unique optical properties.

== See also ==
- Antenna feed
- Category:Radio frequency antenna types
- Category:Radio frequency propagation
- Cellular repeater
- Counterpoise
- Detection
- DXing
- Electromagnetism
- Feedline matching unit
- Mobile broadband modem
- Numerical Electromagnetics Code
- Radial (radio)
- Radio masts and towers
- RF connector
- Smart antenna
- TETRA
- Transmitter hunting
- Shortwave broadband antenna
- Personal RF safety monitor
