= Random wire antenna =

Radio antenna; long wire suspended above the ground

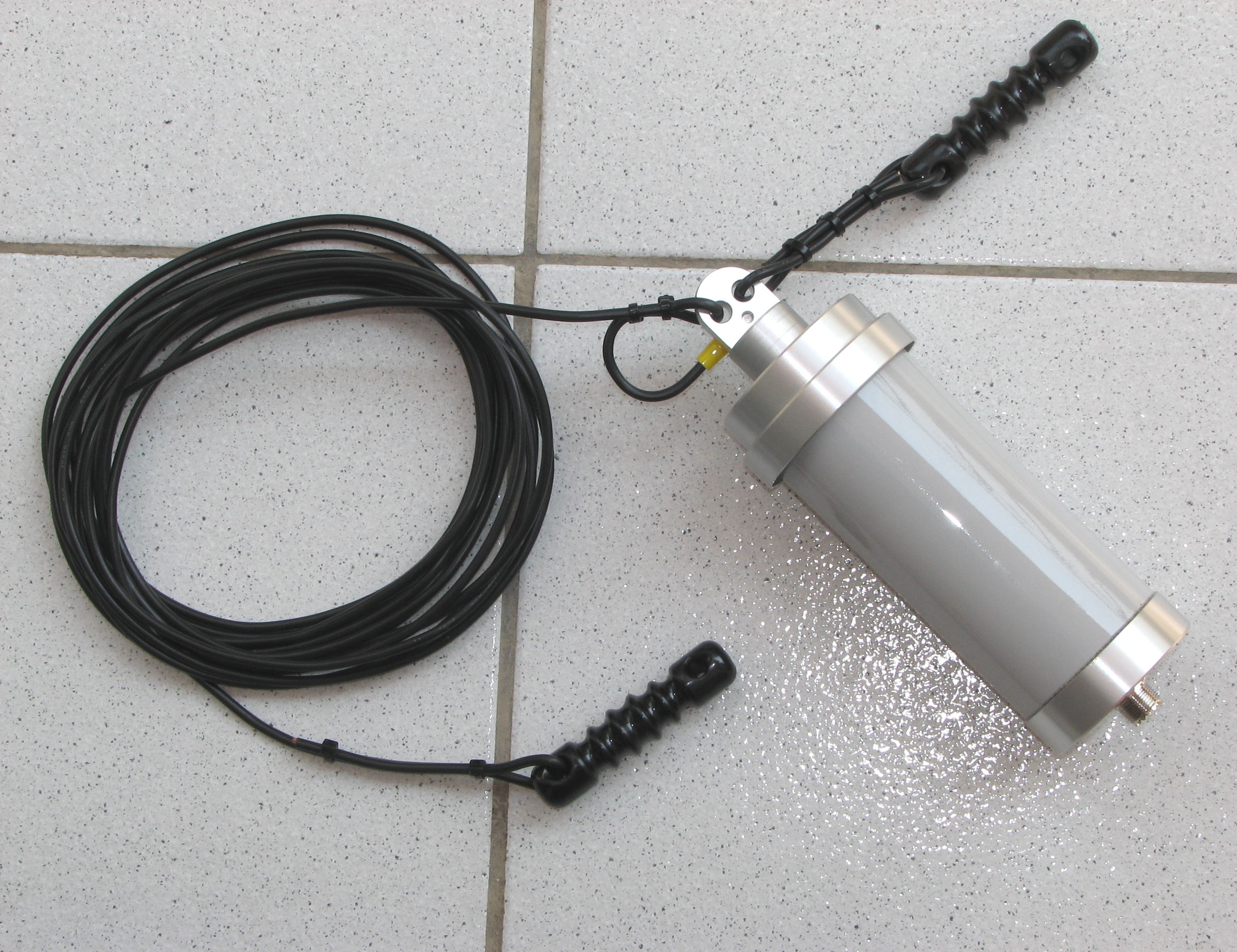
A wire antenna kit, with a coil of wire, strain insulators and a balun. When installed the wire is supported by buildings or trees using the insulators to prevent a short circuit to ground.

A random wire antenna is a radio antenna consisting of a long wire suspended above the ground, whose length does not bear a particular relation to the wavelength of the radio waves used, but is typically chosen more for convenient fit between the available supports, or the length of wire at hand, rather than selecting length to be resonant on any particular frequency. The wire may be straight or it may be strung back and forth between trees or walls just to get as much wire into the air as feasible.

Due to the great variability of the (unplanned) antenna structure, the random wire’s effectiveness can vary erratically from one installation to another, and a single random wire antenna can have wildly different reception / transmission strength in one direction than it achieves in another azimuth direction about 70°~140° different, and finally reception / transmission strengths and directions can be wildly different on only moderately different frequencies.

Random wire antennas are typically fed at one end against a suitable counterpoise (such as earth ground or a parallel wire hidden under the grass below the elevated antenna wire). A combination of two random parallel wires of different length is actually the original zeppelin antenna as defined in the patent from 1909 since this patent does not specify any length to wavelength ratios. With a proper matching unit and a common-mode choke a zeppelin antenna that is end-fed-half-wave in the 17m band can be tuned to all shortwave frequencies.

They are widely used as receiving antennas on the long wave, medium wave, and short wave bands, as well as transmitting antennas on these bands for small outdoor, temporary or emergency transmitting stations, as well as in situations where more permanent antennas cannot be installed.

== Random wire and long wire ==
Often random wire antennas are also (inaccurately) referred to as long-wire antennas. There is no accepted minimum size, but actual long-wire antennas must be greater than at least a quarter-wavelength ( 1 / 4 λ) or perhaps greater than a half ( 1 / 2 λ) at the frequency the long wire antenna is used for, and even a half-wave may only be considered "long-ish" rather than "truly" long; the required lower size limit depends on the book consulted. Most sources consider a "true" long wire to be at least one wavelength, whereas random wire antennas involve no such confusion. Further confusing the issue, if an antenna is used over a wide range of frequencies, some writers may technically qualify it as a long wire at the shorter wavelengths but not at the longer. The term random wire raises no such quibbles: Its only requirement is that the antenna length was not planned for resonance at a particular interesting frequency.

Although antennas an odd numbers of quarter-wavelengths long are easy to feed, when the length of the wire is near an even multiple of a 1 / 4 wave, its feedpoint impedance may take on thousands of Ohms of both reactance and resistance due to antiresonance – extreme values which can exceed the ranges where conventional impedance matching schemes are adequate. The radiation efficiency of the antenna is not changed, despite high resistance; if the antenna had been fed transmit power against a resistive counterpoise (such as a poor ground) and an appropriate matching system is used, the efficiency of the antenna system may actually increase significantly. Based on these considerations, operator W0IPL developed a table of usable odd multiple lengths and un usable even multiple lengths for HF frequencies assigned to amateurs, and then selected a compromise among all of them as an ideal work-any-band length of 74 feet (22.56 m) for the amateur radio HF bands. Hence ~74 feet (22.6 m) is a carefully selected non-random length preferred for an HF "random" length antenna. Another favored length is 100 feet (30.5 m).

== Radiation pattern ==
The radiation pattern of a thin wire antenna is easily predictable using antenna modeling. For a straight wire, the radiation pattern can be described by axially symmetric multipole moments with no component along the wire direction; as the length of the wire is increased, higher multipole contributions become more prominent and multiple lobes (maxima) at angles to the antenna axis develop. Under about 0.6 λ a wire antenna will have a single lobe with a maximum at right angles to the axis. Above this the lobe will split into two conical lobes with their maximum directed at equal angles to the wire, and a null between them. This results in four azimuth angles at which the gain is maximum. As the length of wire in wavelengths increases, the number of lobes increases and the maxima become increasingly sharp.

Any unpredictability of the radiation pattern is caused by uncontrolled interaction with nearby matter (such as soil or structures). For example, a long wire antenna close to the ground will form a leaky two-conductor transmission line and therefore also act somewhat as a traveling wave antenna, with reception off the end of the wire (the system is no longer axially symmetric). A folded or zig-zag antenna may exhibit a more complex pattern as there are even fewer symmetry constraints on the dipole moments that may contribute.

Long wire antennas are reported to be more effective for reception than multi-element antennas such as Yagi or quad antennas with the same length of wire.

== Construction ==
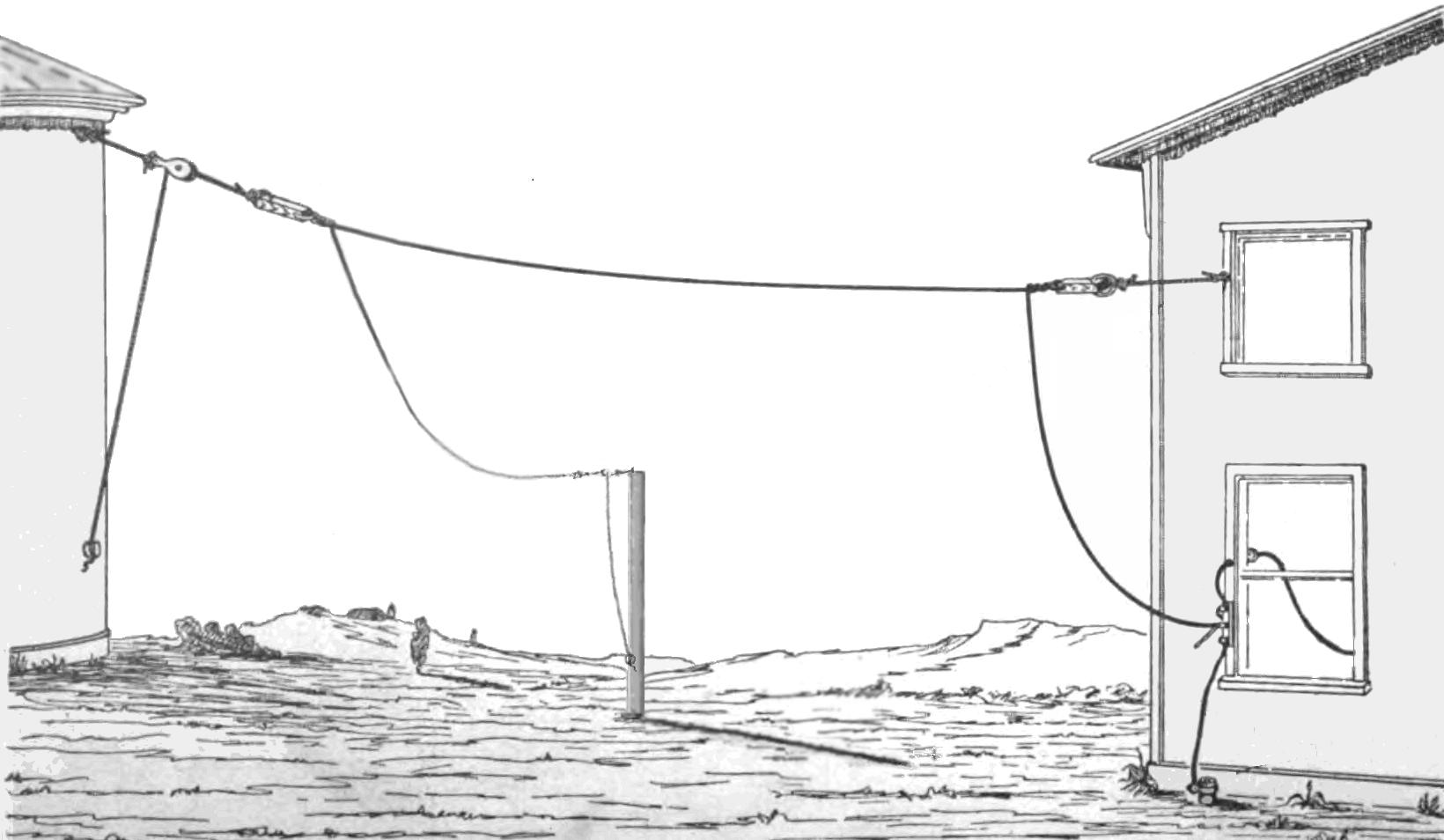
A typical permanent wire antenna strung between two buildings and then extended off to a remote post. This example shows a lightning switch on the window frame, to disconnect the radio and ground the antenna for safety during electrical storms.

A random wire antenna usually consists of a long (at least one quarter wavelength) wire with one end connected to the radio and the other in free space, arranged in any way most convenient for the space available. Ideally, it is strung as high as possible between trees or buildings, with any bends as obtuse as possible, and with the ends insulated from supports. (Note: Any available wire will do for as long as it happens to stay up, and for lengths strung up indoors there are essentially no wire-quality requirements, other than it must conduct electricity only to the radio. The best possible outdoor wire is copper-clad steel wire covered with UV-safe insulation, sized AWG 12 or 14 – diameter 1.6 to 2.0 mm (0.063 to 0.079 in). But the extra expense may not be warranted: If put up outdoors, even the best-made wire will eventually be blown down and have to be restrung. To alleviate stress that wind gusts put on any kind of wire erected outdoors, it is usual to attach the wire at its supports with some kind of strain relief, such as spring-loaded strain insulators, or weight and pulley systems to hold the wire in tension, but yield to unexpected loads added to the wire, such as ice.) (Note: Folding the wire into a zigzag pattern, with acute angles, to fit in a limited space such as an apartment or attic will reduce effectiveness and make theoretical analysis extremely difficult – however the added length typically helps more than the acute folding hurts, and zig-zagging in the last third or quarter of the wire near the antenna's far end is not much trouble at frequencies where the antenna is between about a quarter to a half-wave long.)

If used for transmitting, a random wire antenna usually will also require an antenna tuner, as it has an unpredictable impedance that varies with frequency. One side of the output of the tuner is connected directly to the antenna, without a transmission line, the other to a good earth ground. A wire near an odd number of a quarter-waves in length works best; in contrast, a wire near an even number of quarter-wavelengths long, although fine for receiving, on transmit will exceed the matching ability of most small tuners, unless first fed through an unun with a large transform ratio. Even without a good earth, the antenna will still radiate, although its performance will be poor. A poorly grounded antenna typically manages to radiate by capacitively coupling to any nearby conducting material; transmitting through the antenna without an ample ground system is not recommended.

The ground for a random wire antenna may be chosen by experimentation. The antenna tuner ground could be connected to a nearby cold water pipe (if the pipe used reaches the soil via an all-steel or all-copper segment) or one or several wires laid on the floor or ground, one of which is approximately one-quarter wavelength long, or the ground can be connected to one or several randomly laid-out counterpoise wires under the antenna, at least one of which is a quarter-wavelength.

== See also ==
- Antenna types
