= Halo antenna =

Omnidirectional circular bent dipole antenna

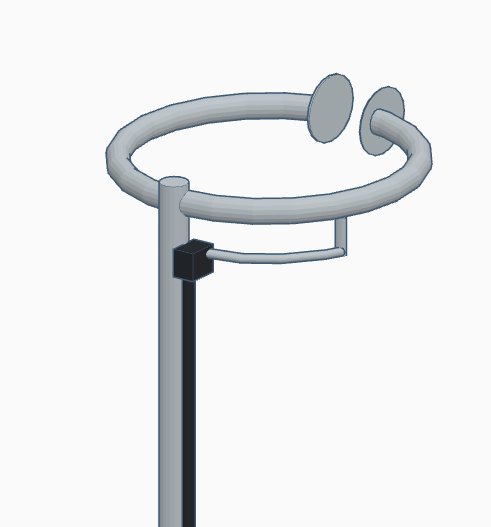
Sketched design of a typical modern-style halo antenna. The sizes of, and space between the round end-plates is adjusted to tune the antenna to resonance; for some halos they are omitted. The thick, black, vertical line is the feed cable, ending in a small black box that contains a trimmer capacitor that with the gamma arm length, impedance matches the antenna feedpoint.

A halo antenna, or halo, is a center-fed 1 /2 wavelength dipole antenna, which has been bent into a circle, with a break directly opposite the feed point. The dipole's ends are close, but do not touch, and the ends on either side of the gap may be flared out to form a larger air gap capacitor, whose spacing is used to fine-adjust the antenna's resonant frequency. Most often halos are mounted horizontally, resulting in the antenna's radiation being horizontally polarized and very nearly omnidirectional.

== Halo antennas vs. loop antennas ==
This section contrasts halo antennas with loop antennas which are electrically dissimilar, but can be confused as they all share the same circular shape, and can have sizes that are indistinguishable, when built for frequencies twice as high or half as high as the halo's design frequency. (Note: Note carefully that for all antenna types, for pattern and performance measurement an antenna's size is measured as a fraction (or multiple) of the length of waves received or transmitted through it; hence any one antenna's effective "size" changes whenever its attached radio is tuned to a different frequency.)

=== Halo vs. large loops ===
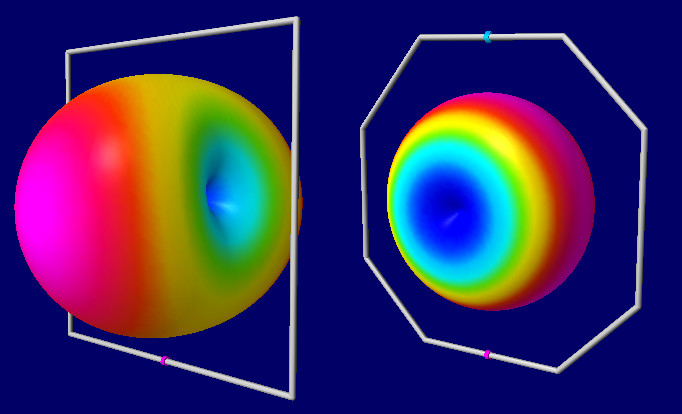
Radiation patterns for a large (left) and a small (right) loop antenna. The light grey square and octagonal rims represent the antenna wires. Colors represent signal strength: magenta and red are "hot" directions of intense signal; blue and indigo are "cold" or low or weak signal; black is no signal. A halo is similar to the right figure, but instead of indigo and black, the center of a halo would be mostly blue: A weak, but non-zero signal.

Although also a resonant antenna, the halo antenna is distinct from the full-wave loop antenna, which is almost exactly double its size for the same operating frequency. In the case of the halo antenna, each half is about a quarter wavelength long and ends with a current node (zero current and peak voltage) at the break. Self-resonant loops with a perimeter of one full wavelength have a radiation pattern which peaks perpendicular to the plane of the loop (along the z axis, in the diagram below) but falls to zero within the plane of the loop, quite opposite the radiation pattern of a halo antenna. Thus, despite the superficial similarity, these two antenna types behave fundamentally differently.

A full-wave loop antenna is slightly more than two half-wavelengths in circumference, which is a bit more than double the size of a halo antenna designed to operate on the same frequency. In contrast, the two semi-circles of a resonant loop, each is a half wavelength long. There is no gap, and each semicircle ends at the semi-circles' connection point, located on the point on the circle opposite from the feedpoint where both semicircles start; current and voltage is continuous across the connection point, which is a voltage node (peak current and zero voltage).

In the radiation diagram (left) the full-wave loop (light grey square, left) has maximum signal (magenta) broadside to its wires, with nulls off the left and right sides of the diagram; the small loop (light grey octagon, right) has its maximum signal within the plane of the antenna-wire octagon, with nulls (black center point) broadside to them.

=== Halo vs. small loops ===
A halo antenna is distinct from the small-loop antenna in size, radiation resistance, and efficiency, but their radiation patterns are nearly the same. A halo antenna is a self-resonant antenna: Its feedpoint impedance is reactance-free / purely resistive at the design frequency. A small loop antenna, on the other hand, has lower radiation resistance (Note: Since the small antenna's radiation resistance is small, at most perhaps a few Ohms, power converted to radio waves can be dwarfed by power lost by heat, due to resistance in the conductor, which is at least a few Ohms. For better transmitting performance, larger antennas are always preferred, but at long wavelengths (lower MF and LF) the size of any resonant antenna (including halo antennas) is unfeasibly large, and because they are more compact than a dipole or monopole, small loops are nevertheless used as a least-worst option.) and is not self-resonant; it requires some form of impedance matching to counter the loop's reactance – in practice, this usually consists of a variable capacitor bridging the point corresponding to the gap of a halo.

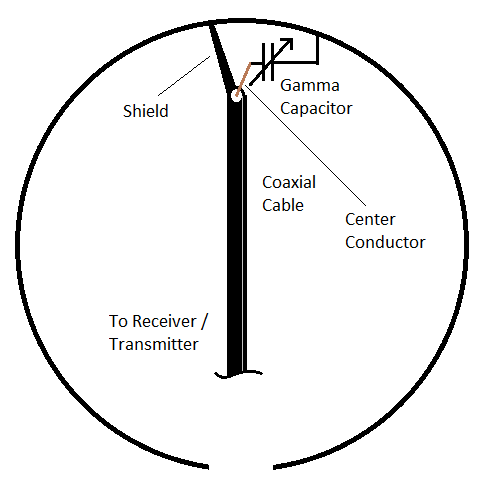
Connection diagram for a gamma matched halo antenna.

The distribution of current along the two arms of a halo antenna is similar to the currents along the two arms (also a quarter wavelength long) of a half-wave dipole (see the animation there), being largest at the feedpoint and dropping to zero at the ends (the gap in the case of the halo). On the other hand, a small loop has a current which is approximately uniform and in‑phase along the conductor. The halo – again like the half-wave dipole – also has voltage peaks at the gap, whereas it is the larger current near the feedpoint most responsible for the radiation produced, with the antenna radiating slightly more towards the split in the loop. The small loop radiates nearly equally in all directions within the plane of the conductor.

Both the halo and small loops' radiation patterns are opposite that of the full-wave loop, being maximum in the plane of the loop, rather than perpendicular to it; halo antennas radiate only a small amount perpendicular to the loop plane, and loops about 1/ 10 wave, or smaller, in practical terms have no perpendicular radiation ("null").

Halos are most often oriented with the plane of the loop aligned horizontally, parallel to the ground, in order to effect an approximately omnidirectional radiation pattern in the horizontal plane and minimize wasteful vertical radiation. Small loops, on the other hand, are often oriented vertically, to take advantage of the small loop's "null" reception by pointing their "deaf" direction (perpendicular to the loop plane) towards a source of interference.

== Mistaken understanding of the halo's gap ==
Although some writers consider the gap in the halo antenna's loop to distinguish it from a small loop antenna – since there is no DC connection between the two ends – that distinction is lost at RF: The close-bent high-voltage ends are connected capacitively, with a RF electrical connection completed through displacement current. Despite the abrupt reversal in voltage across the gap, the RF current bridging the gap is continuous (although possibly momentarily zero).

A "folded dipole" type of halo, similar to the original halo patent. Gain along Y axis 1.2 dBi, gain along Z axis −10 dBi, gain along X axis −1.7 dBi. Fed at the center of the bottom conductor (at the red mark; feed-line not shown), supported at the center of the top conductor which is at ground potential for RF.

The gap in the halo is electrically equivalent to the tuning capacitor on a small loop, although its stray capacitance is not nearly as large as needed for a tuned loop: Capacitance is not needed since the halo antenna is already resonant, but since some small capacitive coupling is present anyway, the arms of the dipole are trimmed back from 97% of a quarter-wave each to restore resonance. Moreover, the halo ends are often pressed even closer together, to increase their mutual capacitance and the ends then cut even shorter to compensate, in order to make the radiation pattern even more nearly omnidirectional, and to produce even less wasteful vertical radiation (Note: High angle radiation is not useful for radio communications, except for near vertical incidence skywave (NVIS) or for signalling fast-orbiting spacecraft with a fixed antenna. For the special case of satellite communications, a radiation pattern that uniformly covers the entire sky is convenient, however the otherwise deprecated vertical radiation of a horizontal halo is too meager to uniformly cover the sky. For local communications by NVIS, vertical radiation is necessary, but at the low frequencies for which the upward signal can be reflected back down, the long wavelengths make the sizes of half-wave loops cumbersome. Furthermore, the frequencies usable for NVIS change from day-to-day, and once built, no halo design as-yet can resize to adapt as needed for the near-daily change in wavelength.) (for a horizontally mounted halo).

== Modern vs. original halo designs ==
Early halo antennas used two or more parallel loops, modeled after a 1943 patent which was a folded dipole bent into a circle, similar to the illustration to the right.

The double loop design can be extended to multiple, stacked electrically parallel loops. Each additional loop increases the radiation resistance in proportion to the square of the number of loops, which broadens the SWR bandwidth, increases radiation efficiency, and up to a point, helps with impedance matching to the feedline.

More recent halo antennas have tended to use a single turn loop, fed with a one-armed gamma match. (Note: A "one-armed" standard gamma match, providing an unbalanced feed, as opposed to a balanced "two-armed" 'T'-match (a gamma match for each side of the feedpoint). The use of an unbalanced gamma match is only a typical feature of modern halos; it is not essential to its design. There are other, less common methods of feeding halos that work just as well, or even better, and any type of feed can support a grounded halo, if the halo's connection to the supporting mast is placed (as shown in the illustrations) at the electrically neutral center of the loop(s) and has a connection to ground through the mast.) The newer approach uses less material and reduces wind load, but has narrower bandwidth, may be mechanically less robust, and usually requires a current balun to inhibit feed-line radiation.

== Advantages and disadvantages of a halo antennas ==
Like all antenna designs, the halo antenna is a compromise that sacrifices one desirable quality for another even more desirable quality – for example halos are small and moderately efficient, but only for a single frequency and a narrow band around it. The following sections discuss the advantages and disadvantages of halo antennas both for practical and theoretical issues.

=== Advantages ===
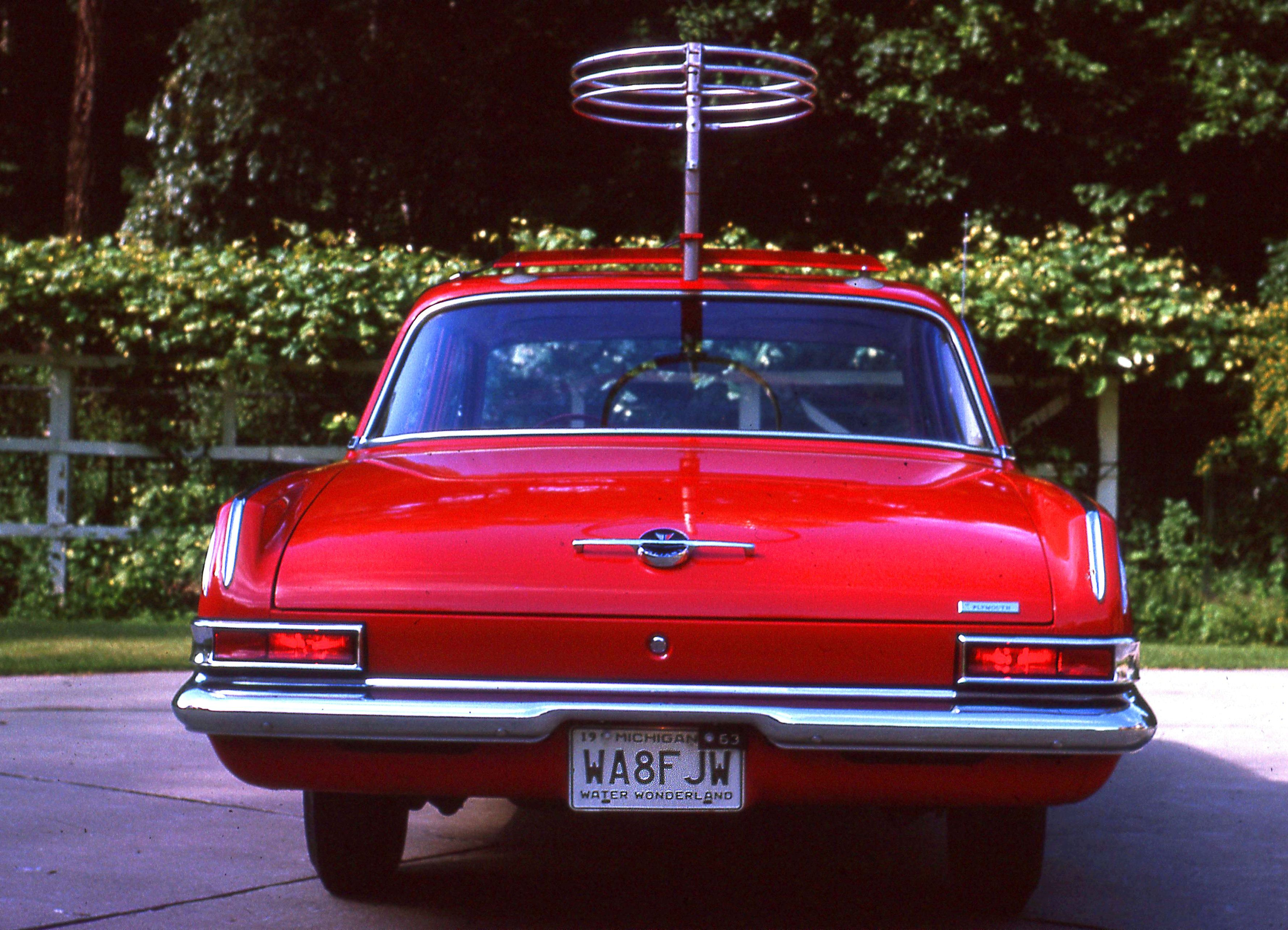
Car roof-mounted 6 meter halo antenna for mobile amateur radio (by WA8FJW). Note the triple-loop.

- The halo is a larger antenna, and consequently is more efficient than a small loop, and roughly the same efficiency as a dipole antenna cut for the same frequency.
- On the VHF bands and above, the physical diameter of a halo is small enough to be effectively used as a mobile antenna.
- Towards the horizon, the pattern is omnidirectional to within 3 dB or less, and that can be evened out by making the loop slightly smaller and adding more capacitance between the element tips. Not only will that even out the gain in the horizontal, it will reduce the largely-wasted upward radiation.
- When either fed with a gamma match, or mounted with the loops' electrically neutral point attached to a conducting mast, the radiating element of the halo is at DC ground, which tends to reduce buildup of noisy static.
- Halos pick up less ignition noise from engines when mounted atop vehicle roofs than whip antennas.
- Halos may be stacked for additional gain and increased efficiency. This reduces the high angle radiation, but has little or no effect on the shape of the radiation pattern in the plane of the antenna.
- A well-constructed halo presents a good match to 50 ohm coaxial cable.

=== Disadvantages ===
- Radiation from horizontal halos has almost no vertical polarization component. One should expect a large signal loss when communicating with a local station with a vertically polarized antenna. (Due to polarization rotation in the ionosphere, there is no such problem with long-distance contacts via ionospheric "bounce" or refraction.)
- The halo antenna is structurally rigid; if attached to a vehicle, it may suffer damage from tree branches or other obstacles, unlike a whip antenna which can bend and spring back.
- A halo antenna is a resonant antenna, providing best performance only around the one frequency it is sized for. On the other hand, a small transmitting loop can be tuned over a 3:1 frequency range with a variable capacitor. (Note: Feasible small loop transmit frequencies are those that make its perimeter between about 1/ 8 λ ~ 1 /3 λ , where the wavelength, λ, is given by λ = ( 299.79 m )/( f [in MHz] ) = ( 983.563 ft. )/( f [in MHz] ) . The highest operating frequency is determined by the minimum capacitance of the small loop's tuning capacitor. The lowest frequency by the maximum capacitance, and by how much loss is tolerable: At lower frequencies the electrical size of the same physical-size loop is smaller, which precipitously reduces the radiation resistance (already quite low for small loops) and makes the already marginal antenna efficiency very poor. A more often seen, but overly conservative range is 1/ 10 ~ 1 /4 wave, which applies to receiving loops. The smaller size is motivated by the desire to sustain the high directivity of the loop's reception null, rather than larger sizes preferred for improved transmit efficiency. However, for receiving shortwaves and mediumwaves, much smaller loop antenna sizes are quite practical, with the circumferences down to perhaps 1/ 16 wavelength or smaller. There is no such latitude with a halo antenna: It can only be (very nearly) 1 /2 wave.)
- For mobile use, the halo is rather conspicuous compared to the much more common vertical whip antenna, and may attract unwanted attention.
- A single-loop halo antenna is not as efficient for long-distance skywave communications as a horizontal small loop (ignoring the benefits of higher radiation resistance) since more of its signal is sent upward instead of outward, wasting signal power "warming the clouds".
