= Ground system =

Ground system may refer to:

- Counterpoise (ground system), a non-radiating part of a radio antenna on or nearest the earth
- Ground (electricity), a reference point in an electrical circuit from which voltages are measured, or a common return path
- Ground segment, the ground-based components of a spacecraft system
