= Radiation resistance =

Type of electrical resistance from an antenna

Radiation resistance is that part of an antenna's feedpoint electrical resistance caused by the emission of radio waves from the antenna. (Note: The radiation resistance R_{rad} is by definition the value measured at a voltage node. It is only a match for a part of the feedpoint resistance in the (common) special case that the feedpoint is placed at the current maximum. If the antenna is fed at any other point, regardless of the reactance (if any), the part of its resistive impedance due to radiation will be transformed, and must be multiplied by a position-dependent correction factor.) A radio transmitter applies a radio frequency alternating current to an antenna, which radiates the energy of the current as radio waves. Because the antenna is absorbing the energy it is radiating from the transmitter, the antenna's input terminals present a resistance to the current from the transmitter.

Radiation resistance is an effective resistance, due to the power carried away from the antenna as radio waves. Unlike conventional ohmic resistance, radiation resistance is not an opposition to current (resistivity) of the imperfect conducting materials the antenna is made of. The radiation resistance ($\ R_\mathsf{rad}\$) is conventionally defined as the value of electrical resistance that would dissipate the same amount of power as heat, as is dissipated by the radio waves emitted from the antenna. From Joule's law, it is equal to the total power $\ P_\mathsf{rad}\$ radiated as radio waves by the antenna, divided by the square of the rms current $\ I_\mathsf{RMS}\$ into the antenna terminals:

$\ R_\mathsf{rad} = P_\mathsf{rad}/I_\mathsf{RMS}^2 ~.$ (Note: Some derivations use the peak sinusoidal current $\ I_\mathsf{peak} = \sqrt{2\ }\ I_\mathsf{RMS}\$ instead of the rms current and the equivalent version of Joule's law: $\ R_\mathsf{rad} = 2P_\mathsf{rad} / I_\mathsf{peak}^2\$) (Note: Note that to produce a value comparable between differently-fed antennas, radiation resistance is referenced to the (nearly) quarter-wave, zero-reactance, maximum-current value, $\ I_\mathsf{max}\$ even when no such current is present on the actual antenna. For example, on a monopole antenna the actual feedpoint impedance is converted to the (possibly non-existent) "maximum current" by dividing by the sine of the electrical length: $\ I_\mathsf{max} \approx \frac{ I_\mathsf{in} }{\ \sin \theta\ }\ ,$ where $\ \theta \equiv 2 \pi \left| z_\mathsf{top} - z_\mathsf{in} \right| / \lambda ~.$ Division by the sine can either be applied to the current or to the resistance; in the latter case the division converts radiation resistance to the radiative part of the feedpoint resistance.)

The feedpoint impedance and radiation resistance are determined by the geometry of the antenna, the operating frequency, and the antenna location (particularly with respect to the ground). The relation between the feedpoint impedance ($\ R_\mathsf{in}\$) and the radiation resistance ($\ R_\mathsf{rad}\$) depends on the position on the antenna at which the feedline is attached. (Note: For a discussion of change of resistance based on height, see Radio antenna § Effect of ground.) The relation between feedpoint impedance and radiation resistance is particularly simple when the feedpoint is placed (as usual) at the antenna's minimum possible voltage / maximum possible current point; in that case, the total feedpoint impedance $\ Z_\mathsf{in} = R_\mathsf{in}\$ at the antenna's terminals is equal to the sum of the radiation resistance plus the loss resistance $\ R_\mathsf{loss}\$ due to "Ohmic" losses in the antenna and the nearby soil: $\ R_\mathsf{in} = R_\mathsf{rad} + R_\mathsf{loss}\ .$ When the antenna is fed at some other point, the formula requires a correction factor discussed below. In a receiving antenna the radiation resistance represents the source resistance of the antenna, and the portion of the received radio power consumed by the radiation resistance represents radio waves re-radiated (scattered) by the antenna.

== Cause ==
Electromagnetic waves are radiated by electric charges when they are accelerated. In a transmitting antenna, radio waves are generated by time varying electric currents, consisting of electrons accelerating as they flow back and forth in the metal antenna, driven by the electric field due to the oscillating voltage applied to the antenna by the radio transmitter. An electromagnetic wave carries momentum away from the electron which emitted it. The cause of radiation resistance is the radiation reaction, the recoil force on the electron when it emits a radio wave photon, which reduces its momentum. This is called the Abraham–Lorentz force. The recoil force is in a direction opposite to the electric field in the antenna accelerating the electron, reducing the average velocity of the electrons for a given driving voltage, so it acts as a resistance opposing the current.

== Radiation resistance and loss resistance ==
The radiation resistance is only part of the feedpoint impedance at the antenna terminals. An antenna has other energy losses which appear as additional resistance at the antenna terminals; ohmic resistance of the metal antenna elements, ground losses from currents induced in the ground, and dielectric losses in insulating materials. When the feedpoint is (as usual) at a voltage minimum and current maximum, the total feedpoint impedance $\ R_\mathsf{in}\$ is equal to the sum of the radiation resistance $\ R_\mathsf{rad}\$ and loss resistance $\ R_\mathsf{loss}\$

$\ R_\mathsf{in} = R_\mathsf{rad} + R_\mathsf{loss}\$

The power $P_\mathsf{in}$ fed to the antenna is split proportionally between these two resistances.

$$\ P_\mathsf{in} =  I_\mathsf{in}^2 (R_\mathsf{rad} + R_\mathsf{loss})\$$
$$\ P_\mathsf{in} = P_\mathsf{rad} + P_\mathsf{loss}$$

where

$\ P_\mathsf{rad} = I_\mathsf{in}^2 R_\mathsf{rad} \quad$ and $\quad P_\mathsf{loss} = I_\mathsf{in}^2 R_\mathsf{loss}\$

The power $\ P_\mathsf{rad}\$ consumed by radiation resistance is converted to radio waves, the desired function of the antenna, while the power $\ P_\mathsf{loss}\$ consumed by loss resistance is converted to heat, representing a waste of transmitter power. So for minimum power loss it is desirable that the radiation resistance be much greater than the loss resistance. The ratio of the radiation resistance to the total feedpoint impedance is equal to the efficiency ($\eta$) of the antenna.

$$\ \eta = {P_\mathsf{rad} \over P_\mathsf{in}} = {R_\mathsf{rad} \over R_\mathsf{rad} + R_\mathsf{loss}}\$$

To transfer maximum power to the antenna, the transmitter and feedline must be impedance matched to the antenna. This means the feedline must present to the antenna a resistance equal to the input resistance $\ R_\mathsf{in}\$ and a reactance (capacitance or inductance) equal but opposite to the antenna's reactance. If these impedances are not matched, the antenna will reflect some of the power back toward the transmitter, so not all the power will be radiated. For antennas a half-wave or larger, in length or perimeter, the radiation resistance is usually the main part of their input resistance, so it mostly determines what impedance matching is necessary and what types of transmission line would match well to the antenna.

== Effect of the feedpoint ==
When the feedpoint is placed at a location other than the minimum-voltage / maximum current point, or if a "flat" voltage minimum does not occur on the antenna, then the simple relation $\ R_\mathsf{in} = R_\mathsf{rad} + R_\mathsf{loss}\$ no longer holds.

In a resonant antenna, the current and voltage form standing waves along the length of the antenna element, so the magnitude of the current in the antenna varies sinusoidally along its length. The feedpoint, the place where the feed line from the transmitter is attached, can be located anywhere along the antenna element. Since feedpoint resistance depends on the input current, it varies with the feedpoint. It is lowest for feedpoints located at a point of maximum current (an antinode), and highest for feedpoints located at a point of minimum current, a node, such as at the end of the element (theoretically, in an infinitesimally thin antenna element, radiation resistance is infinite at a node, but the finite thickness of actual antenna elements gives it a high but finite value, on the order of thousands of ohms).

The choice of feedpoint is sometimes used as a convenient way to impedance match an antenna to its feed line, by attaching the feedline to the antenna at a point at which its input impedance happens to equal the characteristic impedance of the feed line.

In order to give a meaningful value for the antenna efficiency, the radiation resistance and loss resistance must be referred to the same point on the antenna, often the input terminals. Radiation resistance is by convention calculated with respect to the maximum possible current $\ I_\mathsf{0}\$ on the antenna, which for short antennas may not physically occur on the antenna at all. When the antenna is fed at a point of maximum current, as in the common center-fed half-wave dipole or base-fed quarter-wave monopole, that value $\ R_\mathsf{rad\ 0}\$ is only mostly the radiation resistance; it is a common fallacy to suppose that it is actually the radiation resistance. However, if the antenna is fed at some other point, the equivalent radiation resistance at that point $\ R_\mathsf{rad\ 1}\$ can easily be calculated from the ratio of antenna currents

$$\ P_\mathsf{rad} = I_\mathsf{0}^2 R_\mathsf{rad\ 0} = I_\mathsf{1}^2 R_\mathsf{rad\ 1}\$$
$$\ R_\mathsf{rad\ 1} = \left({I_\mathsf{0} \over I_\mathsf{1}} \right)^2 R_\mathsf{rad\ 0} \approx  \left(\frac{\ \sin \theta_\mathsf{0}\ }{ \sin \theta_\mathsf{1} } \right)^2 R_\mathsf{rad\ 0}\$$

where $\ \theta_\mathsf{0}\$ and $\ \theta_\mathsf{1}\$ are the electrical lengths (as electrical degrees or radians) from the current node (usually measured from the tip of a 'linear' antenna).

== Receiving antennas ==
In a receiving antenna, the radiation resistance represents the source resistance of the antenna as a (Thevenin equivalent) source of power. Due to electromagnetic reciprocity, an antenna has the same radiation resistance when receiving radio waves as when transmitting. If the antenna is connected to an electrical load such as a radio receiver, the power received from radio waves striking the antenna is divided proportionally between the radiation resistance and loss resistance of the antenna and the load resistance. The power dissipated in the radiation resistance is due to radio waves reradiated (scattered) by the antenna. Maximum power is delivered to the receiver when it is impedance matched to the antenna. If the antenna is lossless, half the power absorbed by the antenna is delivered to the receiver, the other half is reradiated.

== Radiation resistance of common antennas ==
In all of the formulas listed below, the radiation resistance is the so-called "free space" resistance, which the antenna would have if it were mounted several wavelengths distant from the ground (not including the distance to an elevated counterpoise, if any). Installed antennas will have higher or lower radiation resistances if they are mounted near the ground (less than 1 wavelength) in addition to the loss resistance from the antenna's near electrical field that penetrates the soil. Some of the formulas in the table below substitute the approximate value 120π ohms for the intrinsic impedance of free space.

Antenna type	Radiation resistance (Ω)	Source
Center-fed half-wave dipole	73.1 (Note: Due to end effects a finite thickness dipole is not resonant at a length of one-half wavelength $\ \tfrac{1}{2} \lambda\$ but has inductive reactance. A typical thin dipole is actually resonant (has no reactance) at a slightly shorter length around $\ 0.475\lambda\ =\ 95\%\ \times\ \tfrac{1}{2}\lambda\ ,$ at which length its radiation resistance is about 67 Ω.) (Note: The feedpoint impedance of a horizontal half-wave antenna varies tremendously with height: From about ~45 Ω at ~ 1/ 10 wave above the soil, to slightly over 90 Ω near ~ 1 /4 wave, due to interaction between the antenna and its own emitted waves reflected back from the ground. The resistance begins to settle into 70 Ω somewhere around ~ 3 /4 wave high, but with increasing height continues to oscillate above and below the nominal value until the antenna is well over 1 1 /4 wavelengths above the ground (or the ground plane, if any). The actual radiation resistance is similarly affected. Losses in the feedline, ground, and antenna metal add to the feedpoint impedance, but do not themselves change the radiation resistance.)	Kraus 1988:227; Balanis 2005:216
Short dipole of length $\ \tfrac{1}{50} \lambda < \ell < \tfrac{1}{10} \lambda\$	$20\pi^2\left( \frac{\ \ell\ }{\lambda} \right)^2$	Kraus 1988:216; Balanis 2005:165,215
Base-fed quarter-wave monopole over a perfectly conducting ground plane	36.5	Balanis 2005:217; Stutzman & Thiele 2012:80
Short monopole of length $\ \ell \ll \tfrac{1}{4} \lambda\$ over a perfectly conducting ground plane	$\ 40\pi^2\left( \frac{\ \ell\ }{\lambda} \right)^2\$	Stutzman & Thiele 2012:66
Resonant loop antenna, a little over $\ 1 \times \lambda\$ circumference	~100	Weston 2017:15; Schmitt 2002:236
Small loop of area $\ A\$ with $\ N\$ turns (circumference $\ \ll \tfrac{1}{3} \lambda\$)	$\ 320\pi^4 \left( \frac{\ N\ A\ }{\lambda^2} \right)^2\$	Kraus 1988:251; Balanis 2005:238
Small loop of area $\ A\$ with $\ N\$ turns on a ferrite core of effective relative permeability $\ \mu_\mathsf{eff}\$	$\ 320 \pi^4 \left(\frac{\ \mu_\mathsf{eff}\ N\ A\ }{\lambda^2} \right)^2\$	Kraus 1988:259; Milligan 2005:260

The above figures assume the antennas are made of thin conductors and sufficiently far away from large metal structures, that the dipole antennas are sufficiently far above the ground, and the monopoles are mounted over a perfectly conducting ground plane.

The zero thickness half-wave dipole's radiation resistance of 73 Ω (approx. 67 Ω finite thickness) is near enough to the characteristic impedance of common 50 Ω and 75 Ω coaxial cable that it can usually be fed directly without need of an impedance matching network. This is one reason for the wide use of the half wave dipole as a driven element in antennas.

=== Relationship of monopoles and dipoles ===
The radiation resistance of a monopole antenna created by replacing one side of a dipole antenna by a perpendicular ground plane is one-half of the resistance of the original dipole antenna. This is because the monopole radiates only into half the space, the space above the plane, so the radiation pattern is identical to half of the dipole pattern and therefore with the same input current it radiates only half the power.

This is not obvious from the formulas in the table because the different lengths use the same symbol, $\ell\,;$ the derived monopole antenna, however, is only half the length of the original dipole antenna. This can be shown by calculating the radiation resistance of a short dipole (length $\ \ell_\mathsf{di}\$), which is twice the length of the corresponding monopole ($\ \ell_\mathsf{mon}\$):

$R_\mathsf{rad,dip} = 20\pi^2 \left( \frac{\ \ell_\mathsf{dip}\ }{ \lambda} \right)^2 = 20\pi^2 \left( \frac{ 2 \ell_\mathsf{mon} }{ \lambda} \right)^2 = 80\pi^2 \left( \frac{ \ell_\mathsf{mon} }{ \lambda} \right)^2 \qquad$ (dipole length $\ell_\mathsf{dip} = 2 \ell_\mathsf{mon}$).

Comparing this to the formula for the short monopole shows the dipole has double the radiation resistance of the monopole:

$R_\mathsf{rad,mon} = 40 \pi^2 \left(\frac{\ \ell_\mathsf{mon}\ }{\lambda}\right)^2 \qquad \qquad \qquad \qquad$ (monopole of length $\ell_\mathsf{mon}$).

This confirms the consistency of physically modelling a center-fed dipole as two monopoles, placed end-to-end, with adjacent feedpoints.

== Calculation ==
Calculating the radiation resistance of an antenna directly from the reaction force on the electrons is very complicated, and presents conceptual difficulties in accounting for the self-force of the electron. Radiation resistance is instead calculated by computing the far-field radiation pattern of the antenna, the power flux (Poynting vector) at each angle, for a given antenna current. This is integrated over a sphere enclosing the antenna to give the total power $\ P_\mathsf{rad}\$ radiated by the antenna. Then the radiation resistance is calculated from the law of conservation of energy, as the resistance the antenna must present to the input current to absorb the radiated power from the transmitter, using Joule's law $\ R_\mathsf{rad} = \frac{ P_\mathsf{rad} }{\ I_\mathsf{RMS}^2\ } ~.$

== Small antennas ==
Electrically short antennas, antennas with a length much less than a wavelength, make poor transmitting antennas, as they cannot be fed efficiently due to their low radiation resistance.

At frequencies below 1 MHz the size of ordinary electrical circuits and the lengths of wire used in them is so much smaller than the wavelength, that when considered as antennas they radiate an insignificant fraction of the power in them as radio waves. This explains why electrical circuits can be used with alternating current without losing energy as radio waves. (Note: The contrary problem exists in high-speed electrical circuits, such as are used for personal computers and handheld devices: The frequencies used are very high, in the gigahertz range and beyond, where the wavelengths are on the order of 10 cm – the same size as the device. So for high speed circuits, loss of power due to unwanted radiation is a significant problem, as are other related issues with long trace lines on the circuit boards acting as receiving antennas.)

As can be seen in the above table, for linear antennas shorter than their fundamental resonant length (shorter than 1/ 2 λ for a dipole antenna, 1/ 4 λ for a monopole) the radiation resistance decreases with the square of their length; for loop antennas the change is even more extreme, with sub-resonant loops (circumference less than 1 λ for a continuous loop, or 1/ 2 λ for a split loop) the radiation resistance decreases with the fourth power of the perimeter length. The loss resistance is in series with the radiation resistance, and as the length decreases the loss resistance only decreases in proportion to the first power of the length (wire resistance) or remains constant (contact resistance), and hence makes up an increasing proportion of the feedpoint impedance. So with smaller antenna size, measured in wavelengths, loss to heat consumes a larger fraction of the transmitter power, causing the efficiency of the antenna to fall.

For example, navies use radio waves of about 15–30 kHz in the very low frequency (VLF) band to communicate with submerged submarines. A 15 kHz radio wave has a wavelength of 20 km. The powerful naval shore VLF transmitters which transmit to submarines use large monopole mast antennas which are limited by construction costs to heights of about 300 metres (980 ft) . Although these antennas are enormous compared to a human, at 15 kHz the antenna height is still only about 0.015 wavelength, so paradoxically, huge VLF antennas are electrically short. From the table above, a 0.015 λ monopole antenna has a radiation resistance of about 0.09 Ohm.

It is extremely difficult to reduce the loss resistance of an antenna to this level. Since the ohmic resistance of the huge ground system and loading coil cannot be made lower than about 0.5 ohm, the efficiency of a simple vertical antenna is below 20%, so more than 80% of the transmitter power is lost in the ground resistance. To increase the radiation resistance, VLF transmitters use huge capacitively top-loaded antennas such as umbrella antennas and flattop antennas, in which an aerial network of horizontal wires is attached to the top of the vertical radiator to make a 'capacitor plate' to ground, to increase the current in the vertical radiator. However this can only increase the efficiency to 50–70% at most.

Small receiving antennas, such as the ferrite loopstick antennas used in AM radios, also have low radiation resistance, and thus produce very low output. However at frequencies below about 20 MHz, where static is pervasive, this is not such a problem, since a weak signal from the antenna can simply be amplified in the receiver without the amplifier's noise adding any appreciable amount to the already substantial noise (N) accompanying the signal (S), keeping the ratio S/N as good (or bad) as before.

== Definition of variables ==
Symbol	Unit	Description
$\lambda$	meter (m)	Wavelength of radio waves
$\pi$	[none]	math constant Pi ≈ 3.14159
$\mu_\mathsf{eff}$	[none]	Effective relative permeability of ferrite rod in antenna
$A$	square meters (m²)	Area enclosed within the perimeter of a loop antenna
$f$	hertz (Hz)	Frequency of radio waves
$I_\mathsf{in}$	ampere (A)	RMS current driven into antenna terminals
$I_\mathsf{0}$	ampere (A)	Maximum RMS current in antenna element, at point #0
$I_\mathsf{1}$	ampere (A)	RMS current at an arbitrary point #1 in antenna element
$\ell$	meter (m)	Tip-to-tip length of antenna
$N$	turns	Number of times the loop antenna wire wraps around the perimeter
$P_\mathsf{in}$	watt (W)	Electric power delivered to antenna terminals
$P_\mathsf{rad}$	watt (W)	Power radiated as radio waves by antenna
$P_\mathsf{loss}$	watt (W)	Power consumed in loss resistances of antenna and the nearby ground
$R_\mathsf{rad}$	ohm (Ω)	Nominal radiation resistance of antenna
$R_\mathsf{loss}$	ohm (Ω)	Equivalent loss resistance of antenna at input terminals
$R_\mathsf{in}$	ohm (Ω)	Input resistance of antenna
$R_\mathsf{rad\ 0}$	ohm (Ω)	Radiation-related resistance at point #0 on antenna (minimum voltage / maximum current)
$R_\mathsf{rad\ 1}$	ohm (Ω)	Radiation-related resistance at point #1 on antenna

== See also ==
- Antenna efficiency
- Impedance of free space

== Sources ==
- Feynman, Richard P.; Leighton, Robert B.; Sands, Matthew (1963). The Feynman Lectures on Physics. Vol. I. Addison-Wesley. ISBN 978-0-465-04085-8.
- Balanis, Constantine A. (2005). Antenna Theory: Analysis and Design, 3rd Ed. John Wiley and Sons. ISBN 0-471-66782-X.
- Kraus, John D. (1988). Antennas (2nd ed.). Tata McGraw-Hill. ISBN 0-07-463219-1.
- Milligan, Thomas A. (2005). Modern Antenna Design, 2nd Ed. John Wiley and Sons. ISBN 978-0-471-45776-3.
- Schmitt, Ron (2002). Electromagnetics Explained: A Handbook for Wireless RF, EMC, and High-Speed Electronics. Newnes. ISBN 978-0-7506-7403-4.
- Stutzman, Warren L.; Thiele, Gary A. (2012). Antenna Theory and Design. John Wiley. ISBN 978-0-470-57664-9.
- Weston, David (2017). Electromagnetic Compatibility: Principles and applications (2nd ed.). CRC Press. ISBN 978-1-351-83049-2.
