= William I. Orr =

American amateur radio expert

William Ittner Orr (1919–2001) was an engineer, educator, communicator, and ham radio operator. He was the American author of numerous amateur radio and radio engineering texts. He is best known as the author of The W6SAI Antenna Handbook and fondly remembered for the 1959 Radio Handbook.

== Early life and education ==
Orr grew up in New York, where he was an only-child. His father took little interest in him, and did not encourage him in activities that involved other children. Orr's mother encouraged his early interest in amateur radio. Orr taught himself morse code, and in his early teens held the amateur license of W2HCE, later changing to W6SAI.

After earning his degree in electrical engineering from the University of California at Berkeley, he was hired to work on innovative radar systems for combat airplanes during WW II.

After the war Orr was involved in engineering for the tube manufacturer Eitel-McCullogh (EIMAC). In addition, to working for EIMAC, Orr penned columns for CQ Amateur Radio and Ham Radio magazines. His application notes for EIMAC tubes were favorite reading for amateur radio home builders worldwide.

He was active in amateur radio throughout his life. A well known DXer and a DXCC Honor Roll member, he also conducted a few personal DXing expeditions to exotic locations like Monaco, St. Pierre, and Miquelon.

== Project "OSCAR" ==
In early 1960, William Orr joined a group of radio amateurs (mostly electronic engineers) working to launch a private satellite. By 1962 they had created "OSCAR 1" (Orbiting Satellite Carrying Amateur Radio) at a total cost of $63.47 . "OSCAR" beat out the $50 million Telstar by seven months for the honor of being the world's first privately owned satellite.

"Oscar stayed in orbit for 3 weeks and broadcast "Hi" in Morse Code to "more than 570 Radio Amateur tracking stations in 28 countries including Japan, China, Antarctica, and the Soviet Union."

== Personal life and death ==
Orr married Natalie McCrone; after the war ended they moved to Menlo Park, California, where together they raised six children.

Orr died in his sleep at age 81, on 24 January 2001. He was survived by five daughters, one son, and four grandsons.

== Writing style and topics ==
Orr had the ability to use simple plain language in writing about technical subjects in a way that attracted amateurs who had an interest in the topic but lacked advanced technical background.

Over a period of 40 years, Orr wrote and edited scores of technical books and magazine articles of interest to amateur radio enthusiasts. His topics ranged from basic electronic theory to microwave communications to the theory, design, and construction of antennas.

== Works ==
=== Sole author ===
- Orr, William I. (1959). The Radio Handbook (PDF). Editors and Engineers, Ltd.
- Orr, William I. (November 1990). All About VHF Amateur Radio. Watson-Guptill Publications, Incorporated. ISBN 0-8230-8705-0.
- Orr, William I. (December 1991). The Radio Amateur Antenna Handbook. Radio Amateur Callbook. ISBN 978-0-8230-8706-8.
- Orr, William I. (1993). Vertical Antennas. Watson-Guptill Publications, Incorporated. ISBN 978-0-8230-8710-5.
- Orr, William I. (1996). The W6SAI HF Antenna Handbook. CQ Communications, Incorporated. ISBN 978-0-943016-15-3.
- Orr, William I. Radio Handbook (23 ed.).

=== With Stuart Cowan ===
- Orr, William I.; Cowan, Stuart D. (1971). The Truth about CB Antennas.
- Orr, William I.; Cowan, Stuart D. (1982). All about Cubical Quad Antennas (3rd ed.). Radio Publications. ISBN 978-0-933616-03-5.
- Orr, William I.; Cowan, Stuart D. (November 1990). Simple Low-Cost Wire Antennas for Radio Amateurs. Watson-Guptill Publications, Incorporated. ISBN 978-0-8230-8707-5.
- Orr, William I.; Cowan, Stuart D. (November 1990). Beam Antenna Handbook. Radio Amateur Callbook. ISBN 978-0-8230-8704-4.
- Orr, William I.; Cowan, Stuart D. Better Shortwave Reception.
- Orr, William I.; Cowan, Stuart D. Radio Amateur Callbook (multiple / annual ed.).

=== With others ===
- Nelson, William R.; Orr, William I. (1981). Interference Handbook. Radio Publications. ISBN 978-0-933616-01-1 – via Internet Archive (archive.org).
- Orr, William I.; Stoner, Donald. Novice and Technician Handbook.
- Brier, Herbert; Orr, William I. The VHF Handbook for Radio Amateurs.

== See also ==
- Cubical quad antenna
