= Capacitance hat =

Capacitance hat may refer to:

- Capacitance hat, horizontal wires at the top of a 'T'-antenna or umbrella antenna
- Capacitance hat, a network of rounded wires at the top of a mast radiator
