= Quad antenna =

Type of radio antenna

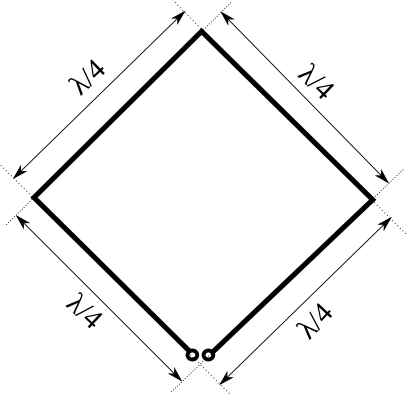
Dimensions of a single element quad antenna

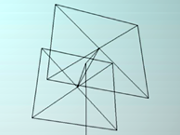
A two-element quad antenna used by an amateur radio station

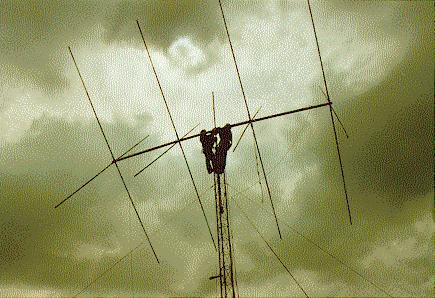
A 4-element amateur radio quad antenna. The two men working on it show the scale. The wire loops are almost invisible, suspended on the ends of the crossed supports.

A quad antenna is a type of directional wire radio antenna used on the HF and VHF bands. A quad is a Yagi–Uda antenna ("Yagi") made from loop elements instead of dipoles: It consists of a driven element and one or more parasitic elements; however in a quad, each of the loop elements may be square, round, or some other shape. It is used by radio amateurs on the HF and VHF amateur bands.

== History ==
The quad antenna is a development of several inventions.

- In 1924, Moses Jacobson patented a loop antenna with rhombic shape.
- In 1938, George Brown et al. patented a loop antenna with rhombic shape and quarterwave sides.
- In 1951 Clarence C. Moore, a Christian missionary and engineer at HCJB (a shortwave missionary radio station high in the Andean Mountains) developed and patented a two-turn loop antenna which he called a "quad". He developed this antenna to resolve issues caused by large coronal discharges while using a beam antenna in the thin air of higher altitudes. Moore describes his antenna as "a pulled-open folded dipole". While the main point of Moore's patent was the two-turn single loop design, which is not the antenna termed "quad" today, the patent does include a mention and illustration of a two-element unidirectional "quad", and describes the time when the full wave loop concept was developed:

"It is a further object of the present invention to provide a loop antenna having an even number of turns of a length of one or more wave lengths around each turn in which substantially no voltage components are present and the only voltage existing is that due to the impedance between the adjacent loops."
"We took about one hundred pounds of engineering reference books with us on our short vacation to Posoraja, Ecuador during the summer of 1942, determined that with the help of God we could solve our problem. There on the floor of our bamboo cottage we spread open all the reference books we had brought with us and worked for hours on basic antenna design. Our prayers must have been answered, for gradually as we worked the vision of a quad-shaped antenna gradually grew with the new concept of a loop antenna having no ends to the elements, and combining relatively high transmitting impedance and high gain."

Moore's design eliminated interference from coronal discharge. Since its elements have no ends, the "end effect", which among other things leads to corona on an ordinary dipole-based Yagi, is absent in a Yagi made from loops (a quad). But other advantages appeared. The higher impedance mentioned in the quote above translates to lower current and thus lower loss on the transmission lines, and gain is higher than that of a dipole Yagi.

- In 1957 James Sherriff McCaig patented what we know as a "cubical" (two-element) multi-band quad antenna.
- In 1960 Rudolf Baumgartner patented the Swiss quad
- In 1969 Werner Boldt invented the DJ4VM quad.
- In 1971 Hans F. Ruckert invented the "Mono-loop tri-band cubical quad".

== Advantages over a dipole-based Yagi–Uda ==
Rigorous testing of the loop Yagi–Uda (quad) antenna show the following advantages over a dipole-based Yagi–Uda antenna made from dipoles:

Polarization
It is easy to change polarization from vertical to horizontal, by changing the feed point.

Multiband antenna
It is easier to design a multiband quad antenna than a multiband Yagi antenna.

Higher gain
The 2-element quad has almost the same gain as a 3-element Yagi: about 7.5 dB over a dipole. Likewise, a 3-element quad has more gain than a 3-element Yagi. However, adding quad elements produces diminishing returns:

"Whereas parasitic beams having twenty or thirty parasitic directors are efficient, high gain antennas, it would seem ... that maximum practical number of parasitic loop elements for the quad array is limited to four or five." — Wm. Orr

Radiation resistance
Radiation resistance is affected by antenna height above ground, element spacing, and environmental conditions. However, values will be higher than for a Yagi and more closely matched to a 50 Ohm coaxial feed.

Lower boom height
"A two-element, three-band quad, with elements mounted only 35 feet above ground, will give good performance in situations where a triband Yagi will not."

Shorter boom
Orr (1996) shows a 10, 15, and 20 meter, 2 element quad with boom length of 6′10″.

Internally stackable
Interaction between antennas of a multiband quad are quite low, even when fed with a single feed line, so higher frequency (smaller) quad loops can be nested in lower frequency (bigger) quad loops, allowing operation on as many bands as there are nested loops.

Lower radiation angle
According to Root (2008) a false claim has persisted for 50 years that quads "open the band earlier", which suggests that quads exhibit a lower angle of radiation than Yagis; computer modelling fails to show any such difference. Root proposes that the vertical sides of each element may actually radiate the low angle component.

== Disadvantages compared to other antennas ==
Bandwidth
If tuned for maximum gain, the bandwidth for a 3-element quad antenna is limited: Deviation from the design frequency will unbalance the near-resonance condition of the parasitic elements. However, lengthening the director elements, thereby sacrificing approximately 1 dB gain, allows for much broader bandwidth.

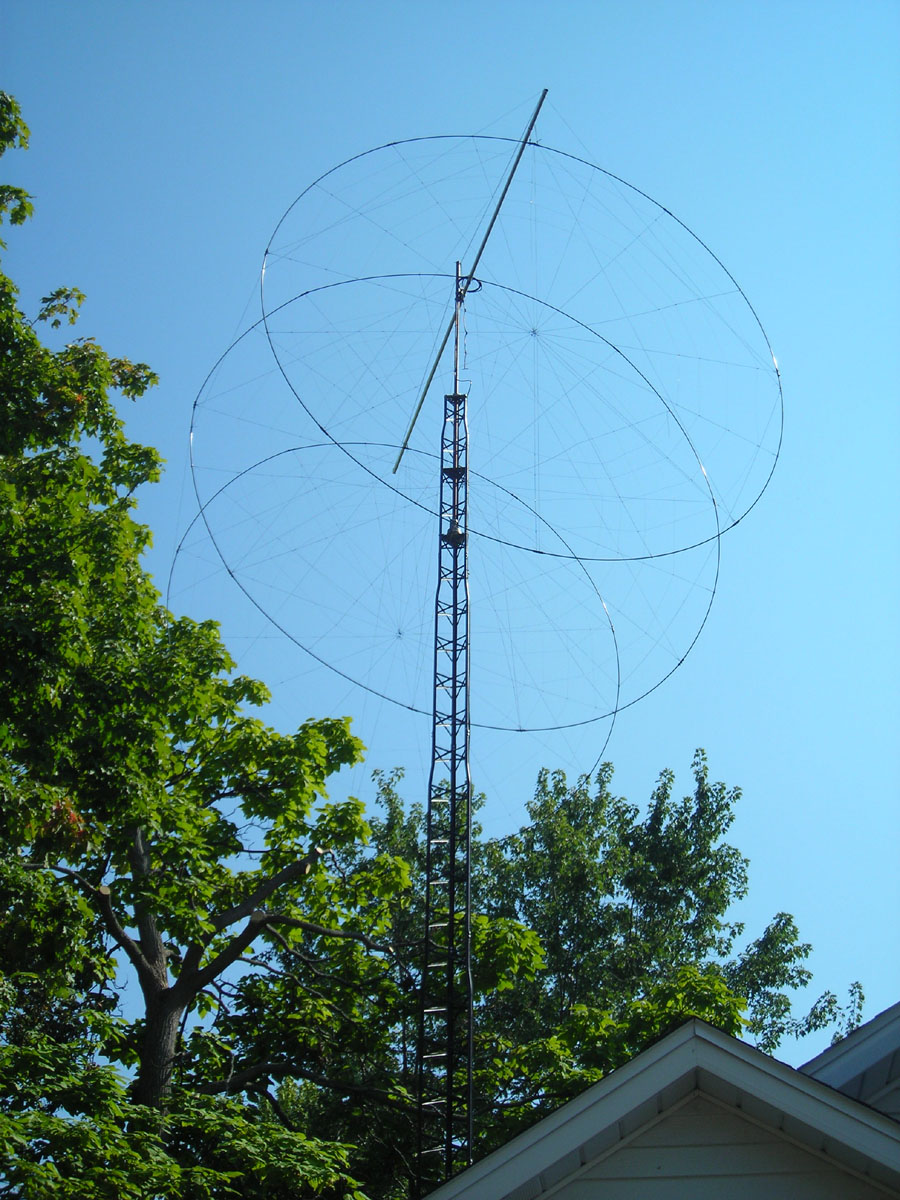
3 element prototype E-Z-O antenna.

Maintenance
A quad is a 3 dimensional antenna so maintenance can be difficult. Even with a tilt-over tower, tall ladders or a bucket truck may be needed. There are locking mechanisms for work on a cubical quad antenna, rotator, or tower that allow the tower to tilt to the ground: They work by releasing the antenna to swivel out of the way when the mast is lowered. When the mast is raised back to its operational position, the antenna is locked into position (the locking mechanism is powered by gravity).

== The E-Z-O variation ==
In 2008, Daniel Mills, designed an antenna that may be an improvement over the quad design. His E-Z-O antenna uses flexible dielectric tubes rather than rigid poles to support the electrical elements. He claims slightly higher gain over the quad due to its roughly circular form.

The claimed magnitude of the dielectric effect on the outside band elements was a surprise, and optimum element lengths were determined by experiment. No reference literature was found: Jefferies & Koulouris (2003) state "As far as we are aware, there has been no reported work on encasing loop antennas in dielectric."

== Sources ==
- Orr, W.I. (1959). The Radio Handbook (PDF). Editors and Engineers, Ltd – via n3ujj.com.
- Orr, W.I. (December 1991). The Radio Amateur Antenna Handbook. Radio Amateur Callbook. ISBN 978-0-8230-8706-8.
