= Null (radio) =

Yagi–Uda antenna polar pattern showing pattern of alternating lobes and nulls

In radio electronics, a null is a direction in an antenna's radiation pattern where the antenna radiates almost no radio waves, so the far field signal strength is a local minimum. Nulls occur because different parts of an antenna radiate radio waves of different phase. In directions at which the antenna radiates equal amplitude radio waves of opposite phase, the radio waves cancel, resulting in little or no radio power being radiated in that direction. In other directions the radio waves from different parts of the antenna are in phase and reinforce, resulting in a maximum signal strength in the radiation pattern, called a lobe.

In transmitting antennas designed to provide broad coverage nulls can be a problem, preventing reception in a given area. Null fill in the vertical plane is used to prevent this.

== Nulling antenna ==
Nulls can also be used to advantage. In a radio receiver the receiver's antenna can be adjusted so the direction of the interference source is located in a null of the antenna, to minimize reception of interference.

Nulls have also been used intentionally to prevent an antenna from broadcasting to a certain area. For example, CIII-DT-22, a repeater of Toronto-based Global TV station CIII-DT in Wheatley has a null towards Windsor to protect broadcast rights of American stations in the bordering Detroit area. In the UK many medium wave stations used directional antenna tower arrays to create nulls towards stations broadcasting on the same frequency.

Radio direction finding (RDF) receivers use special antennas with very narrow, sharp nulls to find the location of transmitters. The antenna is rotated until the received signal is minimum; at that point the antenna's null is pointed along the bearing line to the transmitter.

== See also ==
- Null vector
