= Illumination efficiency =

Extent to which an antenna is uniformly excited

Antenna [aperture] illumination efficiency is a measure of the extent to which an antenna or array is uniformly excited or illuminated. It is typical for an antenna [aperture] or array to be intentionally under-illuminated or under-excited in order to mitigate sidelobes and reduce antenna temperature. It is not to be confused with radiation efficiency or antenna efficiency.

== Definition ==
Antenna [aperture] illumination efficiency is defined as "The ratio, usually expressed in percent, of the maximum directivity of an antenna [aperture] to its standard directivity." It is synonymous with normalized directivity. Standard [reference] directivity is defined as "The maximum directivity from a planar aperture of area A, or from a line source of length L, when excited with a uniform-amplitude, equiphase distribution." Key to understanding these definitions is that "maximum" directivity refers to the direction of maximum radiation intensity, i.e., the main lobe. Therefore, illumination efficiency is not a function of angle with respect to the antenna [aperture], but rather is a constant of the aperture for all aspect angles.

== Standard directivity ==
The distinction between maximum directivity and standard directivity is subtle. However, one can infer that, if an antenna [aperture] were excited [illuminated] uniformly with no phase difference (equiphase) over the entire aperture, then the illumination efficiency would be equal to unity. It is very typical for an antenna [aperture] to be intentionally under-excited [illuminated] with a "taper" in order to reduce radiation pattern sidelobes and antenna temperature. In such a design, the maximum directivity is reduced because the full aperture is not being used to the full extent possible, and the illumination efficiency will be less than unity. IEEE's choice of words is somewhat confusing, because "maximum" directivity is always less than or equal to "standard" directivity. The word maximum, in this case, is used to mean the maximum radiation intensity of the overall directivity pattern, which is otherwise defined for all aspect angles.

== Relationship to antenna efficiency ==
There are critical differences in how various authors and IEEE define antenna efficiency and effective area of an antenna. IEEE defines the antenna efficiency of an aperture-type antenna as, "For an antenna with a specified planar aperture, the ratio of the maximum effective area of the antenna to the aperture area."

$$\eta_a=\frac{A_{e,max}}{A}$$

and under effective area of an antenna, IEEE states, "The effective area of an antenna in a given direction is equal to the square of the operating wavelength times its gain in that direction divided by 4π." Gain is also defined to be less than directivity by the radiation efficiency, $\eta$

$$A_e = G\frac{\lambda^2}{4\pi}=\eta D \frac{\lambda^2}{4\pi}$$

However, other reputable authors define the effective area in terms of the directivity:

$$A_e = D\frac{\lambda^2}{4\pi}$$

Either way, the standard directivity cannot exceed:

$$D_{std} \leq A \frac{4\pi}{\lambda^2}$$

since $\eta_a \leq 1$.

Per the IEEE definitions:

$$D_{max}=\eta_i D_{std} \leq \frac{\eta_i}{\eta_a} A_{e,max} \frac{4\pi}{\lambda^2}=\frac{\eta_i}{\eta_a}\eta D_{max}$$

where $\eta_i$ is the illumination efficiency.

However, per the definition of other authors:

$$D_{max}=\eta_i D_{std} \leq \frac{\eta_i}{\eta_a} A_{e,max} \frac{4\pi}{\lambda^2}=\frac{\eta_i}{\eta_a} D_{max}$$

So clearly there is a problem. If the IEEE definitions are true, then $\frac{\eta_i}{\eta_a}\eta=1$ and therefore $\eta = \frac{\eta_a}{\eta_i}$. Or, if the other authors are correct, then $\eta_a = \eta_i$.
