= Standard linear array =

Standard linear arrays

In the context of phased arrays, a standard linear array (SLA) is a uniform linear array (ULA) of interconnected transducer elements, e.g. microphones or antennas, where the individual elements are arranged in a straight line spaced at one half of the smallest wavelength of the intended signal to be received and/or transmitted. Therefore, an SLA is a subset of the ULA category. The reason for this spacing is that it prevents grating lobes in the visible region of the array.

Intuitively one can think of a ULA as spatial sampling of a signal in the same sense as time sampling of a signal. Grating lobes are identical to aliasing that occurs in time series analysis for an under-sampled signal. Per Shannon's sampling theorem, the sampling rate must be at least twice the highest frequency of the desired signal in order to preclude spectral aliasing. Because the beam pattern (or array factor) of a linear array is the Fourier transform of the element pattern, the sampling theorem directly applies, but in the spatial instead of spectral domain. The discrete-time Fourier transform (DTFT) of a sampled signal is always periodic, producing "copies" of the spectrum at intervals of the sampling frequency. In the spatial domain, these copies are the grating lobes. The analog of radian frequency in the time domain is wavenumber, $k = \frac{2\pi}{\lambda}$ radians per meter, in the spatial domain. Therefore, the spatial sampling rate, in samples per meter, must be $\geq 2 \frac{samples}{cycle} \times \frac{k \frac{radians}{meter}}{2\pi \frac{radians}{cycle}}$. The sampling interval, which is the inverse of the sampling rate, in meters per sample, must be $\leq \frac{\lambda}{2}$.
