= Artifact (error) =

Any error in the perception or representation of information

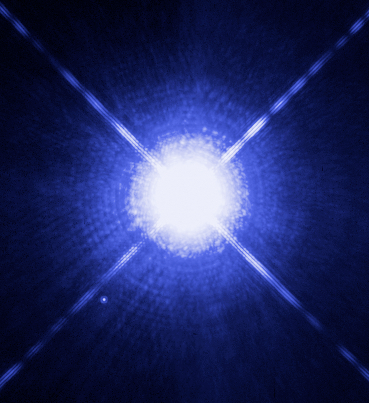
Diffraction spikes and the Airy disk are optical artifacts caused by the diffraction of light through the aperture of an optical system.

In natural science and signal processing, an artifact or artefact is any error in the perception or representation of any information introduced by the involved equipment or techniques.

== Statistics ==
In statistics, statistical artifacts are apparent effects that are introduced inadvertently by methods of data analysis rather than by the process being studied.

== Computer science ==
In computer science, digital artifacts are anomalies introduced into digital signals as a result of digital signal processing.

== Microscopy ==
In microscopy, visual artifacts are sometimes introduced during the processing of samples into slide form.

== Psychology ==
In psychology, experimental artifacts are unintentional results caused by distortions or biases in the experimental process.

== Econometrics ==
In econometrics, which focuses on computing relationships between related variables, an artifact is a spurious finding, such as one based on either a faulty choice of variables or an over-extension of the computed relationship. Such an artifact may be called a statistical artifact. For instance, imagine a hypothetical finding that presidential approval rating is approximately equal to twice the percentage of citizens making more than $50,000 annually; if 60% of citizens make more than $50,000 annually, this would predict that the approval rating will be 120%. This prediction is a statistical artifact, since it is spurious to use the model when the percentage of citizens making over $50,000 is so high, and gross error to predict an approval rating greater than 100%.

== Remote sensing ==
=== Medical imaging ===
In medical imaging, artifacts are misrepresentations of tissue structures produced by imaging techniques such as ultrasound, X-ray, CT scan, and magnetic resonance imaging (MRI). These artifacts may be caused by a variety of phenomena such as the underlying physics of the energy-tissue interaction as between ultrasound and air, susceptibility artifacts, data acquisition errors (such as patient motion), or a reconstruction algorithm's inability to represent the anatomy. Physicians typically learn to recognize some of these artifacts to avoid mistaking them for actual pathology.

In ultrasound imaging, several assumptions are made from the computer system to interpret the returning echoes. These are: echoes originate only from the main ultrasound beam (while there are side lobes and grating lobes apart from the main ultrasound beam); echoes returns to transducer after a single reflection (while an echo can be reflected several times before reaching the transducer); depth of an object relates directly to the amount of time for an echo to reach the transducer (while an echo may reflect several times, delaying the time for the echo return to the transducer); speed of ultrasound in human tissue is constant, echoes travel in a straight path. and acoustic energy of an echo is uniformly attenuated. When these assumptions are not maintained, artifacts occur.

=== Medical electrophysiological monitoring ===
In medical electrophysiological monitoring, artifacts are anomalous (interfering) signals that originate from some source other than the electrophysiological structure being studied. These artifact signals may stem from, but are not limited to: light sources; monitoring equipment issues; utility frequency (50 Hz and 60 Hz); or undesired electrophysiological signals such as EMG presenting on an EEG-, EP-, ECG-, or EOG- signal. Offending artifacts may obscure, distort, or completely misrepresent the true underlying electrophysiological signal sought.

=== Radar ===
Radar multipath echoes from a target cause ghosts to appear.

In radar signal processing, some echoes can be related to fixed objects (clutter), multipath returns, jamming, atmospheric effect (brightband or attenuation), anomalous propagation, and many other effects. All those echoes must be filtered in order to obtain the position, velocity and type of the real targets that may include aircraft, and weather.

== See also ==
- Compression artifact, in computer graphics, distortion of media by the data compression.
- Digital artifact, any undesired alteration in data introduced during its digital processing
- Sonic artifact, in sound and music production, sonic material that is accidental or unwanted, resulting from the editing of another sound.
- Visual artifact, in imaging, any unwanted visual alteration introduced by the imaging equipment.
