= Phased array ultrasonics =

Non-destructive testing method

Animation showing the principle of an ultrasonic scanner used in medical ultrasonic imaging. It consists of a beamforming oscillator (TX) that produces an electronic signal consisting of pulses of sine waves oscillating at an ultrasonic frequency, which is applied to an array of ultrasonic transducers (T) in contact with the skin surface that convert the electric signal into ultrasonic waves traveling through the tissue. The timing of the pulses emitted by each transducer is controlled by programmable delay units (φ) that are controlled by a microprocessor control system (C). The moving red lines are the wavefronts of the ultrasonic waves from each transducer. The wavefronts are spherical, but they combine (superpose) to form plane waves, creating a beam of sound traveling in a specific direction. Since the pulse from each transducer is progressively delayed going up the line, each transducer emits its pulse after the one below it. This results in a beam of sound waves emitted at an angle (θ) to the array. By changing the pulse delays, the computer can scan the beam of ultrasound in a raster pattern across the tissue. Echoes reflected by different density tissue, received by the transducers, build up an image of the underlying structures.

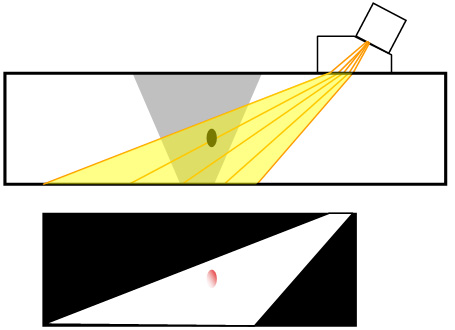
Weld examination by phased array. TOP: The phased array probe emits a series of beams to flood the weld with sound. BOTTOM: The flaw in the weld appears as a red indication on the instrument screen.

Phased array ultrasonics (PA) is an advanced method of ultrasonic testing that has applications in medical imaging and industrial nondestructive testing. Common applications are to noninvasively examine the heart or to find flaws in manufactured materials such as welds. Single-element (non-phased array) probes, known technically as monolithic probes, emit a beam in a fixed direction. To test or interrogate a large volume of material, a conventional probe must be physically scanned (moved or turned) to sweep the beam through the area of interest. In contrast, the beam from a phased array probe can be focused and swept electronically without moving the probe. The beam is controllable because a phased array probe is made up of multiple small elements, each of which can be pulsed individually at a computer-calculated timing. The term phased refers to the timing, and the term array refers to the multiple elements. Phased array ultrasonic testing is based on principles of wave physics, which also have applications in fields such as optics and electromagnetic antennae.

== Principle of operation ==
The PA probe consists of many small ultrasonic transducers, each of which can be pulsed independently. By varying the timing, for instance by making the pulse from each transducer progressively delayed going up the line, a pattern of constructive interference is set up that results in radiating a quasi-plane ultrasonic beam at a set angle depending on the progressive time delay. In other words, by changing the progressive time delay the beam can be steered electronically. It can be swept like a search-light through the tissue or object being examined, and the data from multiple beams are put together to make a visual image showing a slice through the object.

== Use in industry ==
Phased array is widely used for nondestructive testing (NDT) in several industrial sectors, such as construction, pipelines, and power generation. This method is an advanced NDT method that is used to detect discontinuities i.e. cracks or flaws and thereby determine component quality. Due to the possibility to control parameters such as beam angle and focal distance, this method is very efficient regarding the defect detection and speed of testing. Apart from detecting flaws in components, phased array can also be used for wall thickness measurements in conjunction with corrosion testing. Phased array can be used for the following industrial purposes:

- Inspection of welds
- Thickness measurements
- Corrosion inspection
- PAUT Validation/Demonstration Blocks
- Rolling stock inspection (wheels and axles)
- PAUT & TOFD Standard Calibration Blocks

== Features ==
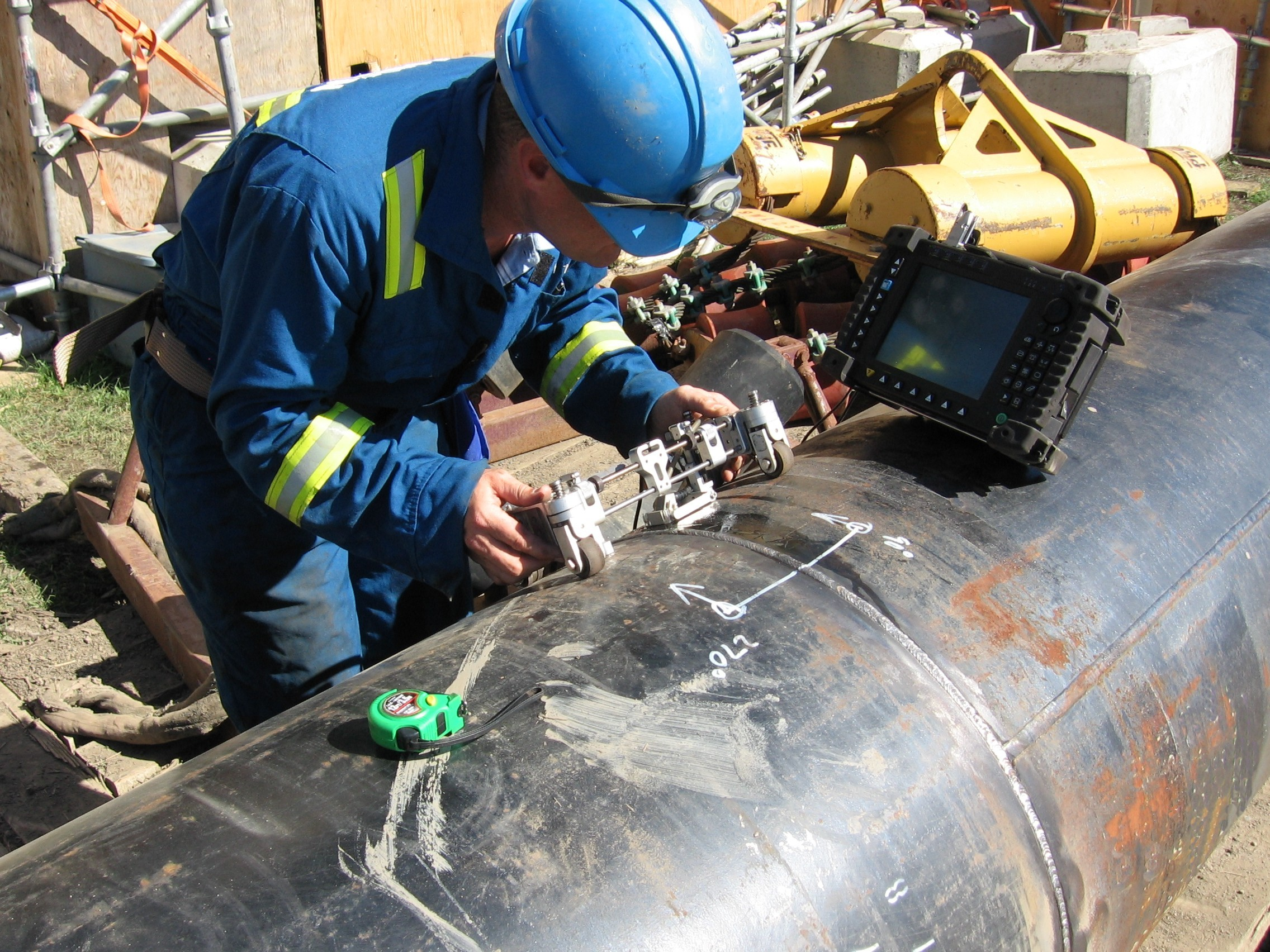
At a construction site, a technician tests a pipeline weld for defects using an ultrasonic phased array instrument. The scanner, which consists of a frame with magnetic wheels, holds the probe in contact with the pipe by a spring. The wet area is the ultrasonic couplant that allows the sound to pass into the pipe wall.

- The method most commonly used for medical ultrasonography.
- Multiple probe elements produce a steerable and focused beam.
- Focal spot size depends on probe active aperture (A), wavelength (λ) and focal length (F). Focusing is limited to the near field of the phased array probe.
  - $\text{Focal spot size} = F\lambda/A$
  - $\text{Near Field} = A^2/4\lambda$
- Produces an image that shows a slice through the object.
- Compared to conventional, single-element ultrasonic testing systems, PA instruments and probes are more complex and expensive.
- In industry, PA technicians require more experience and training than conventional UT technicians.

== Standards ==
European Committee for Standardization (CEN)

- prEN 16018, Non destructive testing - Terminology - Terms used in ultrasonic testing with phased arrays
- ISO/WD 13588, Non-destructive testing of welds – Ultrasonic testing – Use of (semi-) automated phased array technology

== See also ==
- Phased array (general theory and electromagnetic telecommunications).
- Phased array optics

== Books ==
- ASME Boiler and Pressure Vessel Code. American Society Of Mechanical Engineers, 2013. Section V — Nondestructive Examination. [See Article 4 — Ultrasonic Examination Methods for Welds. Para E-474 UT-Phased Array Technique]
