= Antenna boresight =

Optical axis of a directional antenna

In telecommunications and radar engineering, the antenna boresight is the axis of maximum gain (maximum radiated power) of a directional antenna. For most antennas the boresight is the axis of symmetry of the antenna. For example, for axial-fed dish antennas, the antenna boresight is the axis of symmetry of the parabolic dish, and the antenna radiation pattern (the main lobe) is symmetrical about the boresight axis. Most antennas boresight axis is fixed by their shape and cannot be changed. However phased-array antennas can electronically steer the beam, changing the angle of the boresight by shifting the relative phase of the radio waves emitted by different antenna elements, and even radiate beams in multiple directions (multiple boresights).

The term boresight came from high-gain antennas such as parabolic dishes, which produce narrow, pencil-shaped beams which are difficult to aim accurately at a distant receiving antenna. These often are equipped with optical boresights to assist in aiming.
