= Vertical and horizontal (radio propagation) =

In radio propagation, horizontal plane is used to plot an antenna's relative field strength in relation to the ground (which directly affects a station's coverage area) on a polar graph. Normally the maximum of 1.000 or 0 dB is at the top, which is labeled 0° running clockwise back around to the top at 360°. Other field strengths are expressed as a decimal less than 1.000, a percentage less than 100%, or decibels less than 0 dB. If the graph is of an actual or proposed installation, rotation is applied so that the top is 0° true north.

The vertical plane is used to plot an antenna's relative field strength perpendicular to the ground (which directly affects a station's coverage area) on a polar graph.

Normally, the maximum of 1.000 or 0 dB is at the side (unless there is beam tilt), which is labeled 0°, to 90° at the top and −90° at the bottom. Other field strengths are expressed as a decimal less than 1.000, a percentage less than 100%, or decibels less than 0 dB.

Most broadcast antennas use either line-of-sight or ground wave propagation (a slight refraction towards the ground) to reach their nearby listeners, and thus want a low angle in the vertical plane. Short wave transmitters want a somewhat higher elevation angle in the vertical plane to encourage skywave propagation, which would refract or reflect radio waves off the ionosphere and back to the ground at a great distance from the transmitter.

Omnidirectional antennas typically try to limit the range of their vertical plane radiation pattern to concentrate energy over a smaller range and increase gain.
