= Array factor =

Function in the theory of antennas

In the study of antennas, the array factor is a mathematical function that describes the signal of an antenna array as a combination of the signals of its individual antennas. More precisely, the array factor is multiplied by the radiation pattern of an individual antenna to produce the pattern of the entire array. This difference in the patterns is due to the constructive and destructive interference properties of radio waves.

The array factor depends on

- the positions of the individual antennas in the array,
- the complex weights (amplitudes and phases) being used to combine (or excite) the signals of the antennas, and
- the direction of signal arrival (or transmission).

When the antenna weights are chosen appropriately, then the array factor has large magnitude for signals in the desired direction(s) and small in the direction(s) that the array operator wants to ignore. This is how the beam of a phased array is steered.

== Calculation ==
In order to simplify the mathematics, a number of assumptions are typically made:

1. All antennas are identical in every respect.
2. The antennas are uniformly spaced.
3. The signal phase shift between radiators is constant.

The array factor $AF$ is the complex-valued far-field radiation pattern obtained for an array of $N$ isotropic radiators located at coordinates $\vec{r}_n$, as determined by:

$AF(\hat{r}) = \sum_{n=1}^N a_n e^{jk\hat{r}\cdot\vec{r}_n},$

where $a_n$ are the complex-valued excitation coefficients, and $\hat{r}$ is the direction unit vector. The array factor is defined in the transmitting mode, with the time convention $e^{j\omega t}$. A corresponding expression can be derived for the receiving mode, where a negative sign appears in the exponential factors, as derived in reference.

== See also ==
- Array antenna
