= Main lobe =

Region of the radiation pattern of an antenna

A 'polar' antenna radiation diagram. The radial distance from the center represents signal strength.

Electronic scanning of a main lobe of a phased array. There are higher-order main lobes when scan is performed wide range.

In a radio antenna, the main lobe or main beam is the region of the radiation pattern containing the highest power or exhibiting the greatest field strength.

The radiation pattern of most antennas shows a pattern of "lobes" at various directions, where the radiated signal strength reaches a local maximum, separated by "nulls", at which the radiation falls to zero. In a directional antenna in which the objective is to emit the radio waves in one direction, the lobe in that direction is designed to have higher field strength than the others, so on a graph of the radiation pattern it appears biggest; this is the main lobe. The other lobes are called "sidelobes", and usually represent unwanted radiation in undesired directions. The sidelobe in the opposite direction from the main lobe is called the "backlobe".

The radiation pattern referred to above is usually the horizontal radiation pattern, which is plotted as a function of azimuth about the antenna, although the vertical radiation pattern may also have a main lobe. The beamwidth of the antenna is the width of the main lobe, usually specified by the half power beam width (HPBW), the angle encompassed between the points on the side of the lobe where the power has fallen to half (-3 dB) of its maximum value.

The concepts of main lobe and sidelobes also apply to acoustics and optics, and are used to describe the radiation pattern of optical systems like telescopes, and acoustic transducers like microphones and loudspeakers.

== See also ==
- Antenna boresight
- Antenna gain
- Beam radio navigation
- Beam waveguide antenna
- Beamwidth
- Side lobe
- Software defined antenna

This article incorporates public domain material from Federal Standard 1037C. General Services Administration. Archived from the original on 2022-01-22. (in support of MIL-STD-188).
