= Synthetically thinned aperture radar =

Synthetic thinned aperture radiometry (STAR) is a method of radar in which the coherent product (correlation) of the signal from pairs of antennas is measured at different antenna-pair spacings (baselines). These products yield sample points in the Fourier transform of the brightness temperature map of the scene, and the scene itself is reconstructed by inverting the sampled transform. The reconstructed image includes all of the pixels in the entire field-of-view of the antennas.

The main advantage of the STAR architecture is that it requires no mechanical scanning of an antenna. Using a static antenna simplifies the antenna system dynamics and improves the time-bandwidth product of the radiometer. Furthermore, aperture thinning reduces the overall volume and mass of the antenna system. A disadvantage is the reduction of radiometric sensitivity (or increase in rms noise) of the image due to a decrease in signal-to-noise ratio for each measurement compared to a filled aperture. Pixel averaging is required for good radiometric sensitivity.

== See also ==
- Beamforming
- Microwave Imaging Radiometer with Aperture Synthesis (MIRAS), an example of a spaceborne STAR
- Synthetic aperture radar
