= Phased-array optics =

Light wave manipulation

Phased-array optics is the technology of controlling the phase and amplitude of light waves transmitting, reflecting, or captured (received) by a two-dimensional surface using adjustable surface elements. An optical phased array (OPA) is the optical analog of a radio-wave phased array. By dynamically controlling the optical properties of a surface on a microscopic scale, it is possible to steer the direction of light beams (in an OPA transmitter), or the view direction of sensors (in an OPA receiver), without any moving parts. Phased-array beam steering is used for optical switching and multiplexing in optoelectronic devices and for aiming laser beams on a macroscopic scale.

Complicated patterns of phase variation can be used to produce diffractive optical elements, such as dynamic virtual lenses, for beam focusing or splitting in addition to aiming. Dynamic phase variation can also produce real-time holograms. Devices permitting detailed addressable phase control over two dimensions are a type of spatial light modulator (SLM).

== Transmitter ==
An optical phased-array transmitter includes a light source (laser), power splitters, phase shifters, and an array of radiating elements. The output light of the laser source is split into several branches using a power splitter tree. Each branch is then fed to a tunable phase shifter. The phase-shifted light is input to a radiating element (a nanophotonic antenna) that couples the light into free space. Light radiated by the elements is combined in the far-field and forms the far-field pattern of the array. By adjusting the relative phase shift between the elements, a beam can be formed and steered.

== Receiver ==
In an optical phased-array receiver, the incident light (usually coherent light) on a surface is captured by a collection of nanophotonic antennas that are placed on a 1D or 2D array. The light received by each element is phase-shifted and amplitude-weighted on a chip. These signals are then added together in the optic or electronic domain to form a reception beam. By adjusting the phase shifts, the reception beam can be steered to different directions, and light incident from each direction is collected selectively.

== Applications ==
In nanotechnology, phased-array optics refers to arrays of lasers or SLMs with addressable phase and amplitude elements smaller than a wavelength of light. While still theoretical, such high-resolution arrays would permit extremely realistic three-dimensional image display by dynamic holography with no unwanted orders of diffraction. Applications for weapons, space communications, and invisibility by optical camouflage have also been suggested.

DARPA's Excalibur program aims to provide realtime correction of atmospheric turbulence for a laser weapon.

The Breakthrough Starshot organisation has proposed to use phased arrays to precisely aim and steer propulsion lasers for a hypothetical gram-scale solar sail-based craft or fleet of crafts.

== See also ==
- Holography
- Phased array
- Spatial light modulator
