= Radiation pattern =

Directional variation in strength of radio waves

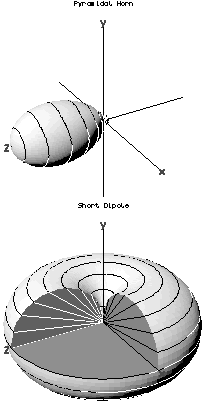
Three-dimensional antenna radiation patterns. The radial distance from the origin in any direction represents the strength of radiation emitted in that direction. The top shows the directive pattern of a horn antenna, the bottom shows the omnidirectional pattern of a simple vertical dipole antenna.

An antenna radiation pattern (or antenna pattern or far-field pattern) is the directional (angular) dependence of the field strength (sometimes also the phase) of the radio waves from the antenna or other source.

Particularly in the fields of fiber optics, lasers, and integrated optics, the term radiation pattern may also be used as a synonym for the near-field pattern or Fresnel pattern. This refers to the positional dependence of the electromagnetic field in the near field, or Fresnel region of the source. The near-field pattern is most commonly defined over a plane placed in front of the source, or over a cylindrical or spherical surface enclosing it.

The far-field pattern of an antenna may be determined experimentally at an antenna range, or alternatively, the near-field pattern may be found using a near-field scanner, and the radiation pattern deduced from it by computation. The far-field radiation pattern can also be calculated from the antenna shape by computer programs such as NEC. Other software, like HFSS can also compute the near field.

The far field radiation pattern may be represented graphically as a plot of one of a number of related variables, like the strength at a constant (large) radius (an amplitude pattern or field pattern), the power per unit solid angle (power pattern), and the directive gain (gain pattern). Very often, only the relative amplitude is plotted, normalized either to the amplitude on the antenna boresight, or to the total radiated power. The plotted quantity may be shown on a linear scale, or in dB. The plot is typically represented as a three-dimensional graph (as at right), or as separate graphs in the vertical plane and horizontal plane. This is often known as a polar diagram.

== Reciprocity ==
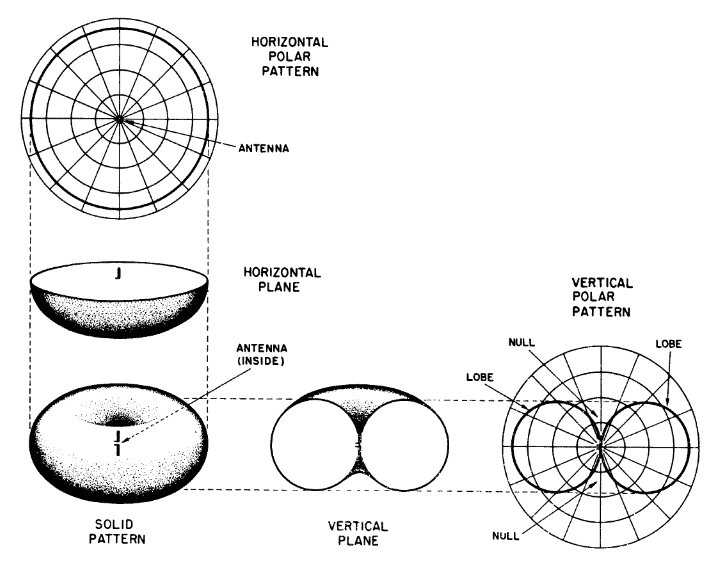
The radiation patterns of a vertical half-wave dipole, an omnidirectional antenna. The horizontal and vertical polar patterns are projections of the 3 dimensional pattern onto horizontal and vertical planes, respectively. An omnidirectional antenna radiates equal signal strength in all horizontal directions, so its horizontal pattern is just a circle.

It is a fundamental property of antennas that the receiving pattern (sensitivity as a function of direction) of an antenna when used for receiving is identical to the far-field radiation pattern of the antenna when used for transmitting. This is a consequence of the reciprocity theorem of electromagnetics and is proved below. Therefore, in discussions of radiation patterns the antenna can be viewed as either transmitting or receiving, whichever is more convenient.

There are limits to reciprocity: It applies only to passive antenna elements – active antennas that incorporate amplifiers or other individually powered components are not reciprocal. And even when the antenna is made of exclusively of passive elements, reciprocity only applies to the waves emitted and intercepted by the antenna. Reciprocity does not apply to the distribution of current in the various parts of the antenna generated by the intercepted waves nor currents that create emitted waves: Antenna current profiles typically differ for receiving and transmitting, despite the waves in the far field radiating inward and outward along the same path, with the same overall pattern, just with reversed direction.

== Typical patterns ==
Typical polar radiation plot. Most antennas show a pattern of "lobes" or maxima of radiation. In a directive antenna, shown here, the largest lobe, in the desired direction of propagation, is called the "main lobe". The other lobes are called "sidelobes" and usually represent radiation in unwanted directions.

Since electromagnetic radiation is dipole radiation, it is not possible to build an antenna that radiates coherently equally in all directions, although such a hypothetical isotropic antenna is used as a reference to calculate antenna gain.

The simplest antennas, monopole and dipole antennas, consist of one or two straight metal rods along a common axis. These axially symmetric antennas have radiation patterns with a similar symmetry, called omnidirectional patterns; they radiate equal power in all directions perpendicular to the antenna, with the power varying only with the angle to the axis, dropping off to zero on the antenna's axis. This illustrates the general principle that if the shape of an antenna is symmetrical, its radiation pattern will have the same symmetry.

In most antennas, the radiation from the different parts of the antenna interferes at some angles; the radiation pattern of the antenna can be considered an interference pattern. This results in minimum or zero radiation at certain angles where the radio waves from the different parts arrive out of phase, and local maxima of radiation at other angles where the radio waves arrive in phase. Therefore, the radiation plot of most antennas shows a pattern of maxima called "lobes" at various angles, separated by "nulls" at which the radiation goes to zero. The larger the antenna is compared to a wavelength, the more lobes there will be.

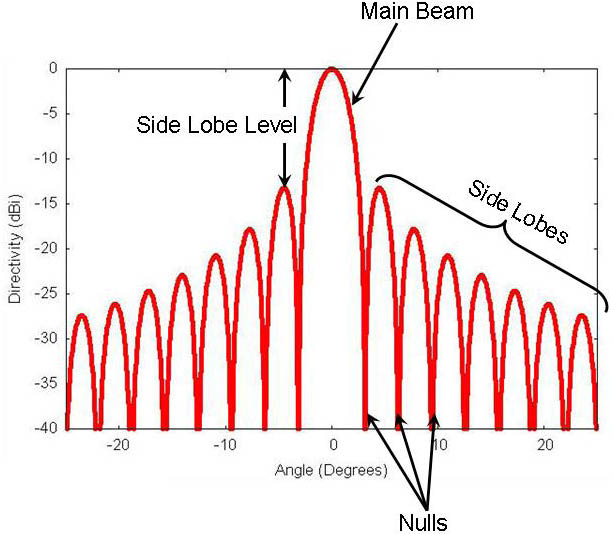
A rectangular radiation plot, an alternative presentation method to a polar plot

In a directional antenna in which the objective is to emit the radio waves in one particular direction, the antenna is designed to radiate most of its power in the lobe directed in the desired direction. Therefore, in the radiation plot this lobe appears larger than the others; it is called the "main lobe". The axis of maximum radiation, passing through the center of the main lobe, is called the "beam axis" or boresight axis". In some antennas, such as split-beam antennas, there may exist more than one major lobe. The other lobes beside the main lobe, representing unwanted radiation in other directions, are called minor lobes. The minor lobes oriented at an angle to the main lobe are called "side lobes". The minor lobe in the opposite direction (180°) from the main lobe is called the "back lobe".

Minor lobes usually represent radiation in undesired directions, so in directional antennas a design goal is usually to reduce the minor lobes. Side lobes are normally the largest of the minor lobes. The level of minor lobes is usually expressed as a ratio of the power density in the lobe in question to that of the major lobe. This ratio is often termed the side lobe ratio or side lobe level. Side lobe levels of −20 dB or greater are usually not desirable in many applications. Attainment of a side lobe level smaller than −30 dB usually requires very careful design and construction. In most radar systems, for example, low side lobe ratios are very important to minimize false target indications through the side lobes.

== Proof of reciprocity ==
For a complete proof, see the reciprocity (electromagnetism) article. Here, we present a common simple proof limited to the approximation of two antennas separated by a large distance compared to the size of the antenna, in a homogeneous medium. The first antenna is the test antenna whose patterns are to be investigated; this antenna is free to point in any direction. The second antenna is a reference antenna, which points rigidly at the first antenna.

Each antenna is alternately connected to a transmitter having a particular source impedance, and a receiver having the same input impedance (the impedance may differ between the two antennas).

It is assumed that the two antennas are sufficiently far apart that the properties of the transmitting antenna are not affected by the load placed upon it by the receiving antenna. Consequently, the amount of power transferred from the transmitter to the receiver can be expressed as the product of two independent factors; one depending on the directional properties of the transmitting antenna, and the other depending on the directional properties of the receiving antenna.

For the transmitting antenna, by the definition of gain, $G$, the radiation power density at a distance $r$ from the antenna (i.e. the power passing through unit area) is

$$\mathrm{W}(\theta,\Phi) = \frac{\mathrm{G}(\theta,\Phi)}{4 \pi r^{2}} P_{t}$$.

Here, the angles $\theta$ and $\Phi$ indicate a dependence on direction from the antenna, and $P_{t}$ stands for the power the transmitter would deliver into a matched load. The gain $G$ may be broken down into three factors; the antenna gain (the directional redistribution of the power), the radiation efficiency (accounting for ohmic losses in the antenna), and lastly the loss due to mismatch between the antenna and transmitter. Strictly, to include the mismatch, it should be called the realized gain, but this is not common usage.

For the receiving antenna, the power delivered to the receiver is

$$P_{r} = \mathrm{A}(\theta,\Phi) W\,$$.

Here $W$ is the power density of the incident radiation, and $A$ is the antenna aperture or effective area of the antenna (the area the antenna would need to occupy in order to intercept the observed captured power). The directional arguments are now relative to the receiving antenna, and again $A$ is taken to include ohmic and mismatch losses.

Putting these expressions together, the power transferred from transmitter to receiver is

$$P_{r} = A \frac{G}{4 \pi r^{2}} P_{t}$$,

where $G$ and $A$ are directionally dependent properties of the transmitting and receiving antennas respectively. For transmission from the reference antenna (2), to the test antenna (1), that is

$$P_{1r} = \mathrm{A_{1}}(\theta,\Phi) \frac{G_{2}}{4 \pi r^{2}} P_{2t}$$,

and for transmission in the opposite direction

$$P_{2r} = A_{2} \frac{\mathrm{G_{1}}(\theta,\Phi)}{4 \pi r^{2}} P_{1t}$$.

Here, the gain $G_{2}$ and effective area $A_{2}$ of antenna 2 are fixed, because the orientation of this antenna is fixed with respect to the first.

Now for a given disposition of the antennas, the reciprocity theorem requires that the power transfer is equally effective in each direction, i.e.

$$\frac{P_{1r}}{P_{2t}} = \frac{P_{2r}}{P_{1t}}$$,

whence

$$\frac{\mathrm{A_{1}}(\theta,\Phi)}{\mathrm{G_{1}}(\theta,\Phi)} = \frac{A_{2}}{G_{2}}$$.

But the right hand side of this equation is fixed (because the orientation of antenna 2 is fixed), and so

$$\frac{\mathrm{A_{1}}(\theta,\Phi)}{\mathrm{G_{1}}(\theta,\Phi)} = \mathrm{constant}$$,

i.e. the directional dependence of the (receiving) effective aperture and the (transmitting) gain are identical (QED). Furthermore, the constant of proportionality is the same irrespective of the nature of the antenna, and so must be the same for all antennas. Analysis of a particular antenna (such as a Hertzian dipole), shows that this constant is $\frac{\lambda^{2}}{4\pi}$, where $\lambda$ is the free-space wavelength. Hence, for any antenna the gain and the effective aperture are related by

$$\mathrm{A}(\theta,\Phi) = \frac{\lambda^{2} \mathrm{G}(\theta,\Phi)}{4 \pi}$$.

Even for a receiving antenna, it is more usual to state the gain than to specify the effective aperture. The power delivered to the receiver is therefore more usually written as

$$P_{r} = \frac{\lambda^{2} G_{r} G_{t}}{(4 \pi r)^{2}} P_{t}$$

(see link budget). The effective aperture is however of interest for comparison with the actual physical size of the antenna.

=== Practical consequences ===
- When determining the pattern of a receiving antenna by computer simulation, it is not necessary to perform a calculation for every possible angle of incidence. Instead, the radiation pattern of the antenna is determined by a single simulation, and the receiving pattern inferred by reciprocity.
- When determining the pattern of an antenna by measurement, the antenna may be either receiving or transmitting, whichever is more convenient.
- For a practical antenna, the side lobe level should be minimum, it is necessary to have the maximum directivity.

== See also ==
- Antenna modeling
- E-plane and H-plane
- Vertical and horizontal (radio propagation)
