= Ferrite core =

Magnetic core on which the windings of electric transformers and inductors are formed

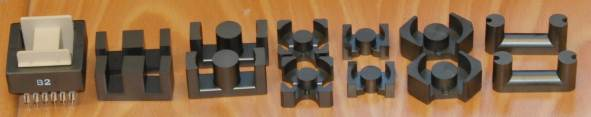
Several ferrite cores

In electronics, a ferrite core is a type of magnetic core made of ferrite on which the windings of electric transformers and other wound components such as inductors are formed. It is used for its properties of high magnetic permeability coupled with low electrical conductivity (which helps prevent eddy currents). Moreover, because of its comparatively low losses at high frequencies, ferrite is extensively used for the cores of RF transformers and inductors in applications such as switched-mode power supplies and ferrite loopstick antennas for AM radio receivers.

== Ferrites ==
Ferrites are ceramic compounds of the transition metals with oxygen, which are ferrimagnetic but non-conductive. Ferrites that are used in transformer or electromagnetic cores contain iron oxides combined with nickel, zinc, and/or manganese compounds. They have a low coercivity and are called "soft ferrites" to distinguish them from "hard ferrites", which have a high coercivity and are used to make ferrite magnets. The low coercivity means the material's magnetization can easily reverse direction while dissipating very little energy (hysteresis losses); at the same time, the material's high resistivity prevents eddy currents in the core, another source of energy loss. The most common soft ferrites are:

- Manganese-zinc ferrite (MnZn, with the formula Mn_{a}Zn_{(1−a)}Fe_{2}O_{4}). MnZn have higher permeability and saturation levels than NiZn.
- Nickel-zinc ferrite (NiZn, with the formula Ni_{a}Zn_{(1−a)}Fe_{2}O_{4}). NiZn ferrites exhibit higher resistivity than MnZn, and are therefore more suitable for frequencies above 1 MHz.

For applications below 5 MHz, MnZn ferrites are used; above that, NiZn is the usual choice. The exception is with common mode inductors, where the threshold of choice is at 70 MHz.

As any given blend has a trade-off of maximum usable frequency, versus a higher mu value, within each of these sub-groups, manufacturers produce a comprehensive range of materials for different applications blended to give either a high initial (low frequency) inductance or lower inductance and higher maximum frequency, or for interference suppression ferrites, an extensive frequency range, but often with a very high loss factor (low Q).

It is essential to select the suitable material for the application, as the correct ferrite for a 100 kHz switching supply (high inductance, low loss, low frequency) is quite different from that for an RF transformer or ferrite rod antenna, (high frequency, low loss, but lower inductance), and different again from a suppression ferrite (high loss, broadband)

== History ==
Ferrites were invented in 1930 by Yogoro Kato and Takeshi Takei at the Tokyo Institute of Technology. TDK began mass production of ferrite cores in 1937 for radio equipment; the development of ferrite materials and their applications was recognized as an IEEE Milestone in 2009.

== Applications ==
There are two broad applications for ferrite cores that differ in size and frequency of operation: signal transformers, which are of small size and higher frequencies, and power transformers, which are of large size and lower frequencies. Cores can also be classified by shape, such as toroidal, shell, or cylindrical cores.

The ferrite cores used for power transformers work in the low-frequency range (1 to 200 kHz usually) and are relatively large in size, can be toroidal, shell, or shaped like the letters 'C', 'D', or 'E'. They are useful in all kinds of electronic switching devices – especially power supplies from 1 Watt to 1000 Watts maximum, since more robust applications are usually out of range of ferritic single core and require grain-oriented lamination cores.

The ferrite cores used for signals have a range of applications from 1 kHz to many MHz, perhaps as much as 300 MHz, and have found their main application in electronics, such as in AM radios and RFID tags.

== Ferrite rod aerial ==
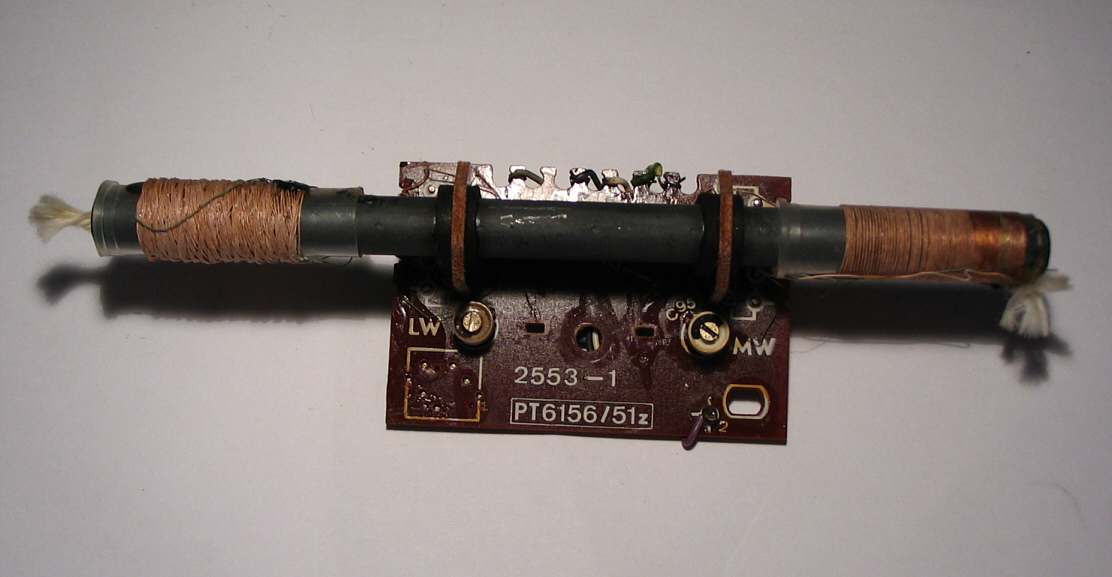
Loopstick antenna from an AM radio having two windings, one for long wave and one for medium wave (AM broadcast) reception. Typically 10 cm (4 inches) long, these loop antennas are usually hidden inside the radio receiver.

Ferrite rod aerials (or antennas) are a type of small magnetic loop (SML) antenna ubiquitous in AM radio broadcast band transistor radios. However, they began to be used in vacuum tube ("valve") radios in the 1950s. They are also helpful in very low frequency (VLF) receivers, and can sometimes give good results over most of the shortwave frequencies (assuming a suitable ferrite is used). They consist of a coil of wire wound around a ferrite rod core (usually several inches longer than the coil). This core effectively concentrates the magnetic field of the radio waves to give a stronger signal than could be obtained by an air core loop antenna of comparable size, although still not as strong as the signal that could be obtained with a good outdoor wire aerial.

Other names include "loopstick antenna", "ferrod", and "ferrite-rod antenna". "Ferroceptor" is an older alternative name for a ferrite rod aerial, mainly used by Philips where the ferrite core would be called a "Ferroxcube" rod (a brand name acquired by Yageo from Philips in the year 2000). The short terms "ferrite rod" or "loop-stick" sometimes refer to the coil-plus-ferrite combination that takes the place of both an external antenna and the radio's first tuned circuit or just the ferrite core itself (the cylindrical rod or flat ferrite slab).

== See also ==
- Balun
- Ferrite bead
- Ferrite (magnet)
- Ferrite (iron)
- Magnetic core
- Toroidal inductors and transformers
- Zinc ferrite
