= Sheath current =

Electromagnetic defect

A sheath current is an electric current that flows along the outer conductor (shield or sheath) of a cable. In coaxial cable and high-voltage cables, sheath currents can arise from differences in ground potential, electromagnetic coupling, or electrical faults. In cross-bonded high-voltage cables, the distribution of sheath currents along the sheath can indicate the health of the grounding system, with irregular distributions signaling possible faults.

Shielding the coaxial cable acts as a Goubau line

Sheath currents may affect the performance of signal or power transmission and can induce electromagnetic interference in nearby circuits. In coaxial cables, differences in ground potential at the ends of the cable can create common-mode voltages superimposed on the useful signal, effectively acting as noise. Such currents are often associated with ground loops or improper grounding.

== Countermeasures against sheath currents ==
High-frequency signal lines may attenuate or prevent sheath currents using a sheath current filter which is applied to a coaxial cable in or near the device. In the simplest case, this is a ferrite bead, it includes the coaxial inner and outer conductor and acts as a common-mode choke. At the same time, a ferrite bead has a transformer effect, so that a useful signal is confirmed as differential-mode. To increase the inductance compared to the unwanted common mode signal component, the cable can also be repeatedly passed through or wound around the bead.

Sheath current filter for high-power lines

In addition, higher frequency signals are often used with a capacitive coupling filter. More information is available in the article sheath current filter.

With a balun, sheath currents can be avoided when a balanced line is connected to an unbalanced line. Without the use of baluns, sheath currents will occur on the unbalanced line. A use for this is the combination of a symmetric dipole antenna with a coaxial line.

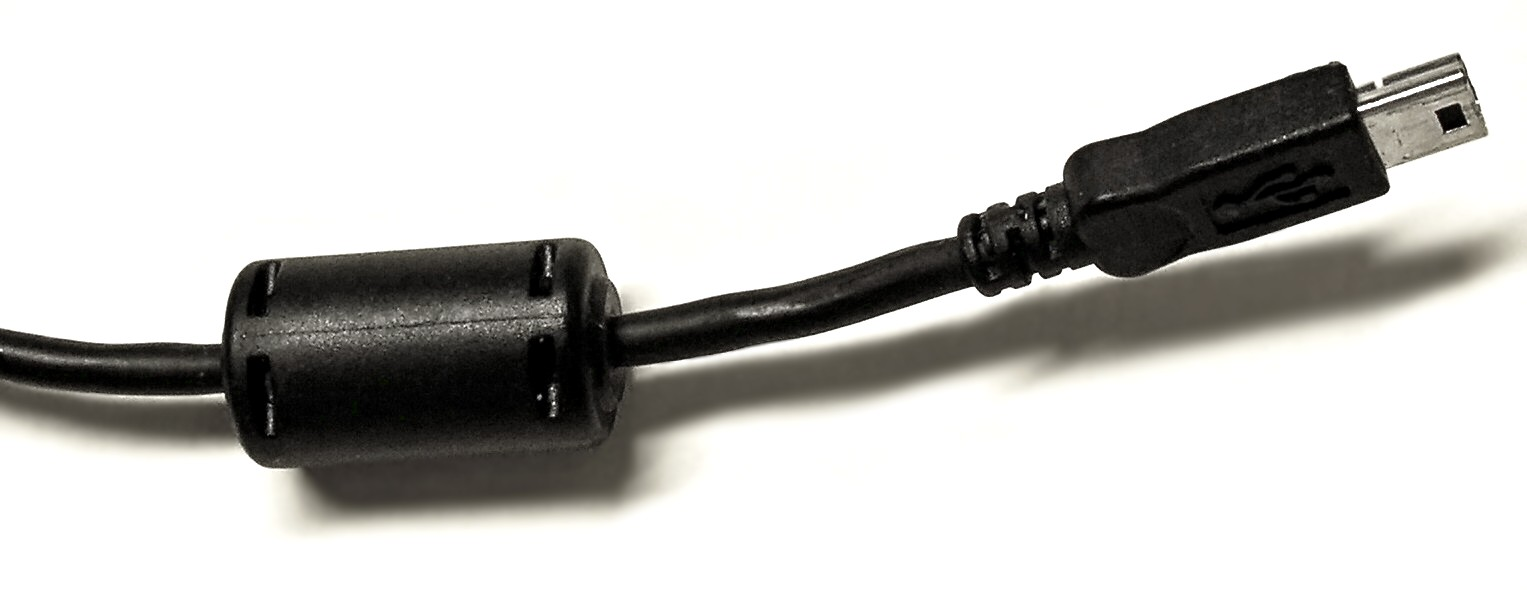
USB cable with a ferrite bead as a sheath current filter
