= Ferrite =

Ferrite may refer to:

- Ferrite (iron), one of the allotropes of iron that is stable at room temperature and pressure, α-Fe
- Ferrite (magnet), a ferrimagnetic ceramic material

== See also ==
- Ferrite bead, a component placed on the end of a data cable to reduce interference
- Ferrite core, a structure on which the windings of electric transformers and other wound components are formed
- Barium ferrite (BaFe_{12}O_{19}), a ferrimagnetic ceramic material
- Bismuth ferrite, a promising multiferroic material
- Calcium aluminoferrite, Ca_{2}(Al,Fe)_{2}O_{5}, a mineral found in cements
