= Sheath current filter =

Electronic components

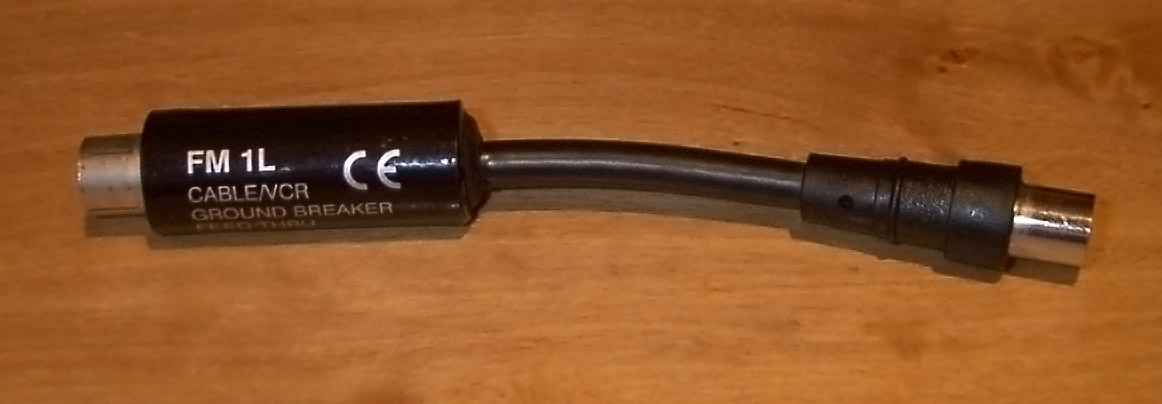
A sheath current filter for a 75Ω antenna cable

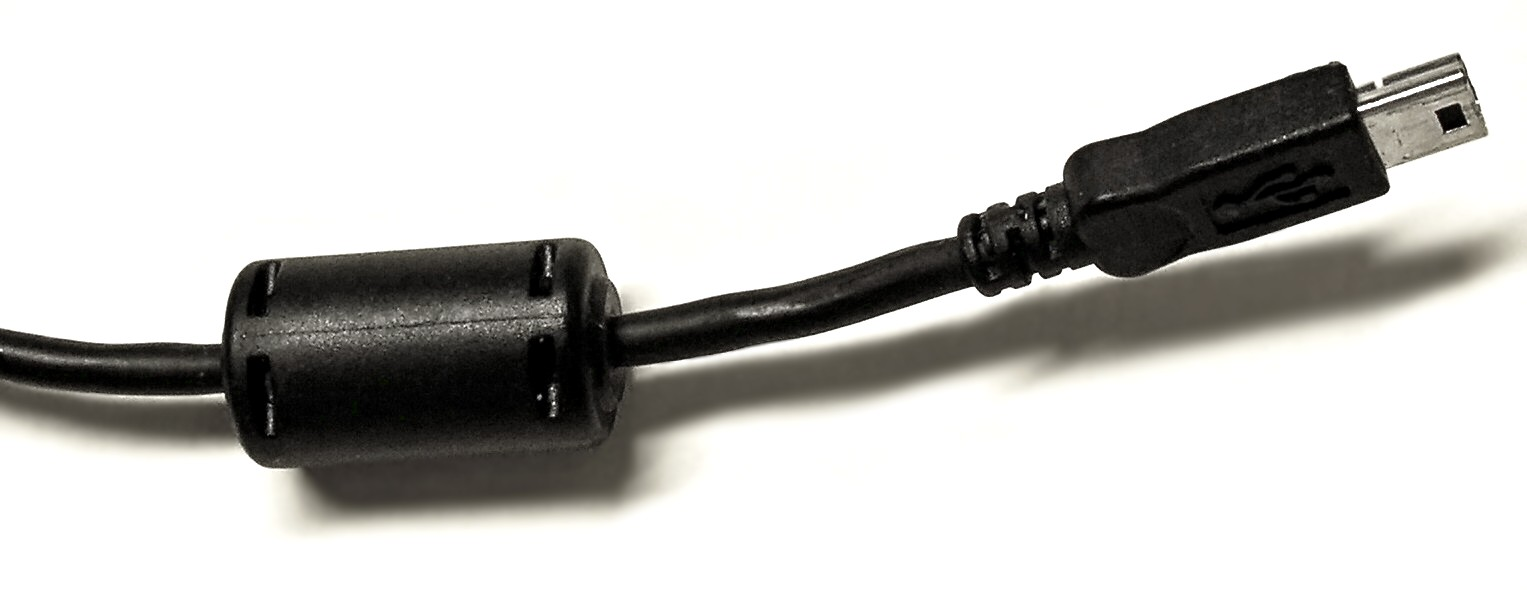
A ferrite bead acting as a sheath current filter on a USB cable

Sheath current filters are electronic components that can prevent noise signals travelling in the sheath of sheathed cables, which can cause interference. Using sheath current filters, ground loops causing mains hum and high frequency common-mode signals can be prevented.

Depending on the type, sheath current filters can remove or ameliorate hum in audio equipment, scanning frequencies in AV equipment and unwanted common-mode signals in coaxial cables.

== Type ==
There are various types of sheath current filter. Different types have different characteristics and are used to combat different forms of sheath current.

=== Isolation transformer ===
Isolation transformers are transformers for low frequency analog and digital audio connections or rarely for high-frequencies in antenna cables between TV outlets and devices (tuner, VCR, TV, etc.). This filter then suppresses low-frequency ground loop currents on the sheath and core of coaxial cables, which can result from multiple grounds at different potentials. They affect the signal because of their upper and lower frequency limits and therefore can not transmit DC. In addition, analog signals can suffer from nonlinear distortion, especially near the frequency limits of the device.

=== Capacitive coupler ===
Schematic diagram of a capacitive coupler sheath current filter

The propagation of (low-frequency) ripple current through antenna cables may be prevented by capacitive coupling of the two conductors. Such elements are available as adapters called braid-breakers or ground breakers and have, in both the signal and ground connection, coupling capacitors (with a capacitance of approximately 1 nF). They are generally only capable of passing frequencies greater than approximately 50 MHz - ripple current cannot flow. Capacitive coupling adapters have an upper limit frequency of around 1 GHz, so UHF signals can pass through. A passband of approximately 50 MHz to 1 GHz makes the devices useful for analog and digital television reception, and broadcast FM radio reception. Such ground breakers cannot be used in commercial satellite receivers, since low-frequency control signals and the supply voltage for the low-noise block converter have to be transferred.

=== Ferrite chokes ===
Ferrite sheath current filters consist of a ferrite sleeve around the line or cable bundle. These are common mode chokes, damping high-frequency common-mode noise on cables.

They block to high-frequency common-mode currents above about 50 MHz and affect the signal and the ground connection is not in terms of their Low frequency properties or protective function. Ferrite sheath current filters cannot effectively attenuate ground loop noise.

Cables for connection of computer peripherals often have a ferrite bead. The cable can be used to increase the inductance also repeatedly passed through a ferrite core.

Ferrite sheath current filters can only work effectively if a common-mode signal can flow on a line. This is generally the case when a cable bundle or a coaxial cable has a ground connection at both ends to the grounded equipment.

For a cable bundle between two devices but grounded at only one device, in general a ferrite sheath current filter is not effective. With such an arrangement, a ferrite bead would only be effective to reduce sheath current standing waves. When used to eliminate standing waves, the ferrite sheath current filter must be placed at a current antinode, but not at standing wave nodes.

Ferrite beads are available for different frequency ranges and power capacity.

== Application ==
Transformer sheath current filters are used in low-frequency signal lines, where a ground loop otherwise can not be prevented. They are galvanically isolated.

Capacitive coupling filters can be used to prevent hum loops in antennas and radio frequency cables. They also have a galvanic separation.

Ferrite sheath current filters are used for noise suppression, combating noise such as radio frequency interference. They have no electrical isolation and cannot prevent ground loops.

== See also ==
- Sheath current
