= Television interference =

Disruption to reception of television signals

Television interference (TVI) is a particular case of electromagnetic interference which affects television reception. Many natural and man-made phenomena can disrupt the reception of television signals. These include naturally occurring and artificial spark discharges, and effects due to the operation of radio transmitters.

Analog television broadcasts display different effects due to different kinds of interference. Digital television reception generally gives a good quality picture until the interference is so large that it can no longer be eliminated by the error checking systems in the receiver, at which point the video display becomes pixelated, distorts, or goes blank.

== Co-channel and multipath (ghost) ==
During unusual atmospheric conditions, a distant station normally undectable at a particular location may provide a much stronger signal than usual. The analog television picture may display the sum of the two signals, producing an image from the strong local signal with traces or "ghosts" from the distant, weaker signal. Television broadcast stations are located and assigned to channels so that such events are rare. Readjustment of the receiving antenna may allow more of the distant signal to be rejected, improving image quality.

A local signal may travel by more than one path from the transmitter to receiving antenna. "Multipath" reception is visible as multiple impressions of the same image, slightly shifted along the width of the screen due to the varying transmission path. Some multipath reception is momentary due to road vehicles or aircraft passing; other multipath problems may persist due to reflection off tall buildings or other landscape features. Strong multipath can cause the analog picture to "tear" or momentarily lose synchronization, causing it to roll or flip.

== Static electricity and sparks ==
The sparks generated by static electricity can generate interference.

Many systems where radio frequency interface is caused by sparking can be modeled as the following circuit. The source of energy charges C1 via a resistance, and when the spark gap breaks down, the electricity passes through L and excites the resonant LC circuit. The energy in the LC circuit is then radiated through the aerial.

Diagram of a spark transmitter

As an example, when a person walks over a nylon carpet, the rubbing of shoes on carpet performs the role of a battery and resistor, while the person acts as a capacitor (C1 and C2), and the air between a hand and a door knob is a spark gap. Stray inductance acts as L.

== Sparks and allied phenomena ==
Horizontal lines randomly arranged on a television screen may be caused by sparking in a malfunctioning electrical device. Electric railways can also be a strong source of this type of interference.

Other possible sources of such interference include thermostats, fridges, freezers, fish tank heaters, central heating systems. These can create sparks as they turn on or off; as they age they can become worse. In some rare cases they can create non-stop interference through sparking. Electric motors that have a commutator can suffer from sparking at the brushes. Ignition systems on cars and motorbikes.

== Devices which switch at powerline frequency ==
Power line hardware can generate sparks at either a 100 or 120 Hz rate

Light dimmers and other solid state power control devices can generate interference.

Thyristor and TRIAC regulators without proper chokes are a common source of EMI as well. It is likely that a thyristor (SCR) power controller using the variable phase angle method will generate harmonics of the mains supply, while the spark at a contact will be a very wide band source whose frequency is not related to the power supply frequency. In Thyristor control systems the potential for EMI problems can be minimised by using zero crossing switching where the thyristor is switched on at the moment of time when the AC voltage changes from one direction to the other.

A typical SCR based light dimmer which dims the light through phase angle control. This unit is wired in series with the load. Diodes (D_{2}, D_{3}, D_{4} and D_{5}) for a bridge which generates DC with much ripple. R and C form a circuit with a time constant, as the voltage increases from zero (at the start of every halfwave) C will charge up, when C is able to make ZD conduct and inject current into the SCR the SCR will fire. When the SCR conducts then D_{1} will discharge C via the SCR. The SCR will shut off when the current falls to zero when the supply voltage drops at the end of the half cycle, ready for the circuit to start work on the next half cycle.

== Devices which switch faster than 200 Hz ==
Computers and other digital electronic equipment containing rapidly switching circuits. These devices create and use signals which are switched on/off at great speed, approximately square waves. Any repetitive signal can be reduced down to a Fourier series of sine waves. A perfect square wave with fundamental frequency ω is:

$E(t; \omega) = E_0 \sin(\omega t) + \frac{E_0 \sin(3\,\omega t)}{3} + \frac{E_0 \sin (5\,\omega t)}{5} + \dots$

The square wave contains harmonics of the fundamental (that is, sine waves with a frequency that is a multiple of the fundamental frequency ω) which go on upwards in frequency for ever, although at a decreasing amplitude. These harmonics are responsible for much of the interference created by computers. A modern PC is a device which is operating in the VHF/UHF frequency range using square waves. As the cases on many computers are not perfect shields, some of this radio-frequency energy can leak out and cause interference to radio (and sometimes TV) reception.

Switched-mode power supplies or packs can be a source of interference. These are used in consumer electronic products such as phone charges and in some lighting systems.

== Strong TV signals ==
It is possible to also get a bad picture if the signal strength of the TV transmitter is too high. An attenuator inserted in the antenna lead-in wire may be used if the television receiver displays signs of overload in the RF front end. Strong out-of-band signals may also affect television reception and may require band-pass filters to reduce the level of the undesired signal at the receiver.

== See also ==
- Television interference (ghosting)
- Television interference (Co-channel reception)
- EMC problem (excessive field strength)
