= Zinc ferrite =

Zinc ferrites are a series of synthetic inorganic compounds of zinc and iron (ferrite) with the general formula of Zn_{x}Fe_{3−x}O_{4}. Franklinite is a naturally occurring mineral with the composition ZnFe_{2}O_{4} and is the geological counterpart of these synthetic ferrites.

== Preparation and properties ==
Zinc ferrite compounds can be prepared by aging solutions of Zn(NO_{3})_{2}, Fe(NO_{3})_{3}, and triethanolamine in the presence and in the absence of hydrazine, or reacting iron oxides and zinc oxide at high temperature. Spinel (Zn, Fe) Fe_{2}O_{4} appears as a tan-colored solid that is insoluble in water, acids, or diluted alkali. Because of their high opacity, zinc ferrites can be used as pigments, especially in applications requiring heat stability. For example, zinc ferrite prepared from yellow iron oxide can be used as a substitute for applications in temperatures above 350 °F (177 °C). When added to high corrosion-resistant coatings, the corrosion protection increases with an increase in the concentration of zinc ferrite.

One investigation shows that the zinc ferrite, which is paramagnetic in the bulk form, exhibits ferrimagnetism in nanocrystalline thin film format. A large room temperature magnetization and narrow ferromagnetic resonance line width have been achieved by controlling thin films growth conditions.

== Applications and research ==
Zinc ferrite is of research interest in energy storage devices. Flexible electrodes for hybrid capacitors can be prepared using nanostructured gadolinium doped zinc ferrite (GZFO), reinforced with carbon nanotubes (CNT), and supported on aluminum foil (AF). A specific capacitance of 887 F g⁻¹ at a current density of 1 A g⁻¹ was measured and the electrode maintained 94.5% of its capacitance after 7000 charge–discharge cycles at 15 A g⁻¹. An energy density of 40.025 Wh kg⁻¹ and a power density of 279.78 W kg⁻¹ were measured, indicating its potential for powering wearable electronic devices.

== See also ==
- Ferrite core
- Ferrite (magnet)
- Franklinite
- Zinc smelting
