= Decoupling (electronics) =

Prevention of undesired energy transfer between electrical subsystems

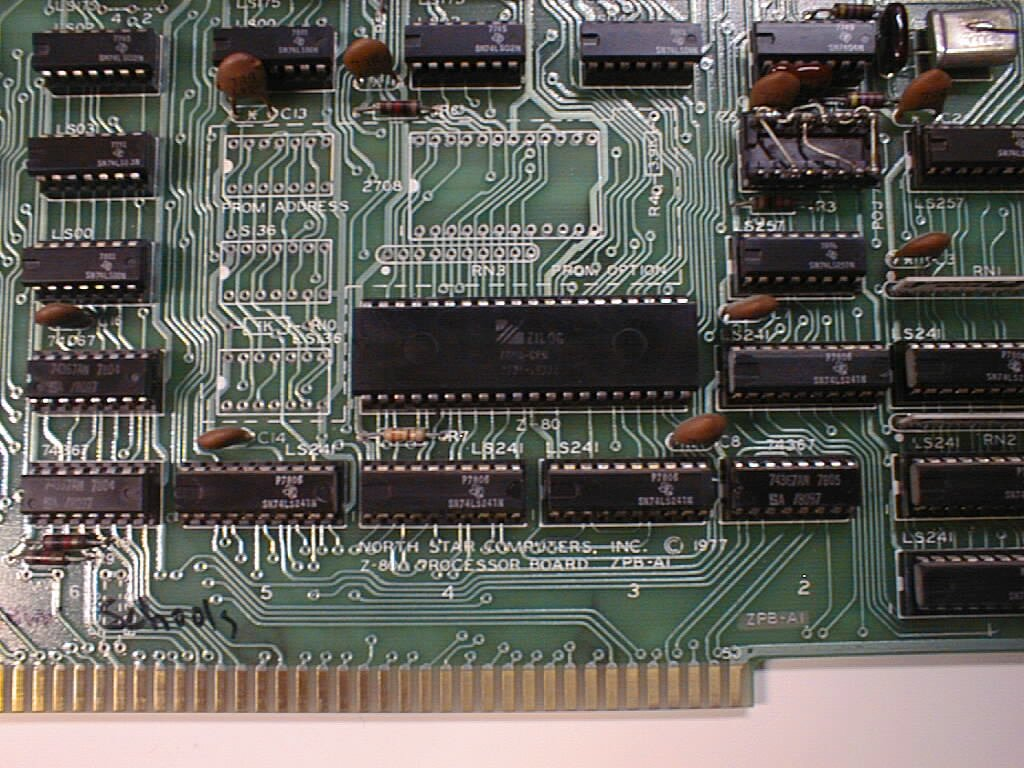
A processor board with decoupling of the power rails at every other chip using small capacitors. The through-hole technology shown is obsolescent (surface-mount technology is now the norm) but the general principles of decoupling remain the same.

In electronics, decoupling is the prevention of undesired electrical energy transfer (coupling) between subsystems.

A common example is connecting localized decoupling capacitors close to the power leads of integrated circuits to suppress coupling via the power supply connections. These act as a small localized energy reservoir that supply the circuit with current during transient, high current demand periods, preventing the voltage on the power supply rail from being pulled down by the momentary current load. Another common example of the use of decoupling capacitors is across the emitter bias resistor of transistor common emitter amplifiers to prevent the resistor absorbing a portion of the AC output power of the amplifier.

Lossy ferrite beads may also be used to isolate or 'island' sections of circuitry. These add a high series impedance (in contrast to the low parallel impedance added by decoupling capacitors) to the power supply rails, preventing high-frequency currents being drawn from elsewhere in the system.
