= Choke (electronics) =

Inductor used as a low-pass filter

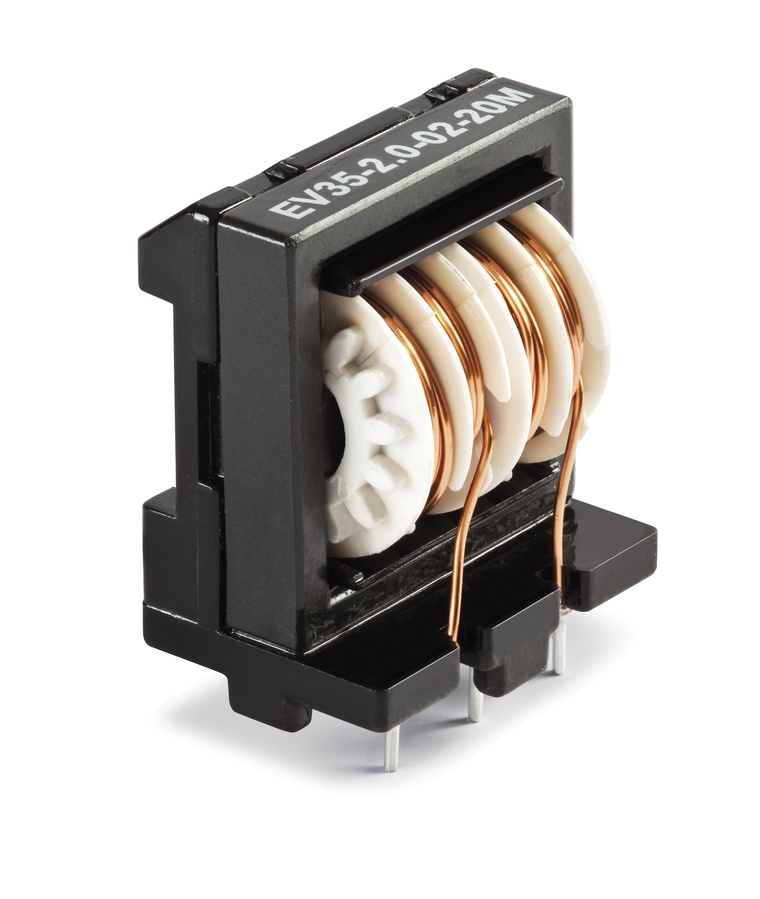
Common-mode choke with two 20 mH windings, rated to handle 2 amperes

In electronics, a choke is an inductor used to block higher-frequency alternating currents (AC) while passing direct current (DC) and lower-frequency ACs in a circuit. A choke usually consists of a coil of insulated wire often wound on a magnetic core, although some consist of a doughnut-shaped ferrite bead strung on a wire. The choke's impedance increases with frequency. Its low electrical resistance passes both AC and DC with little power loss, but its reactance limits the amount of AC passed.

The name comes from blocking—"choking"—high frequencies while passing low frequencies. It is a functional name; the name "choke" is used if an inductor is used for blocking or decoupling higher frequencies, but the component is simply called an "inductor" if used in electronic filters or tuned circuits. Inductors designed for use as chokes are usually distinguished by not having low-loss construction (high Q factor) required in inductors used in tuned circuits and filtering applications.

== Types and construction ==
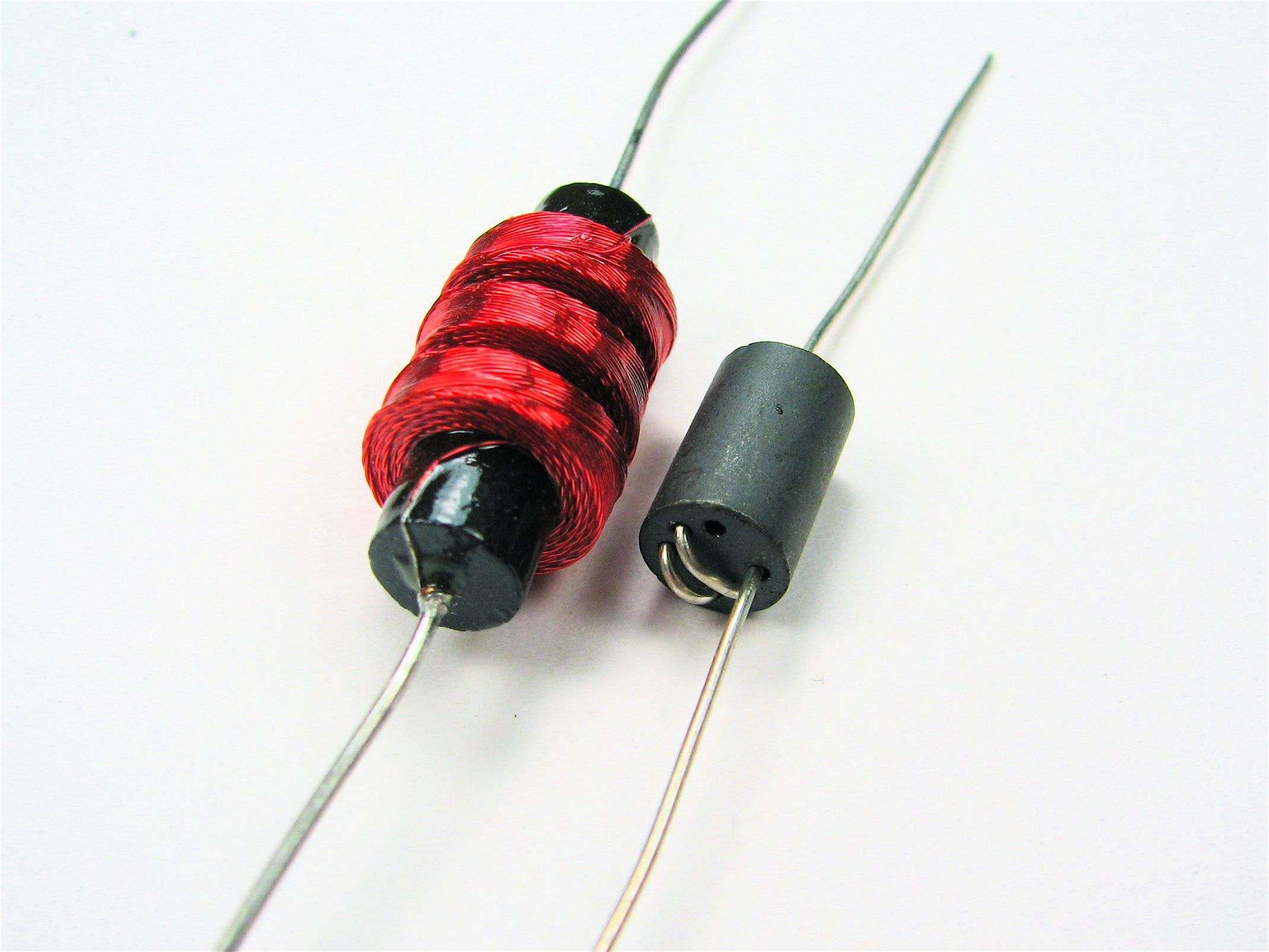
An MF or HF radio choke for tenths of an ampere, and a ferrite bead VHF choke for several amperes

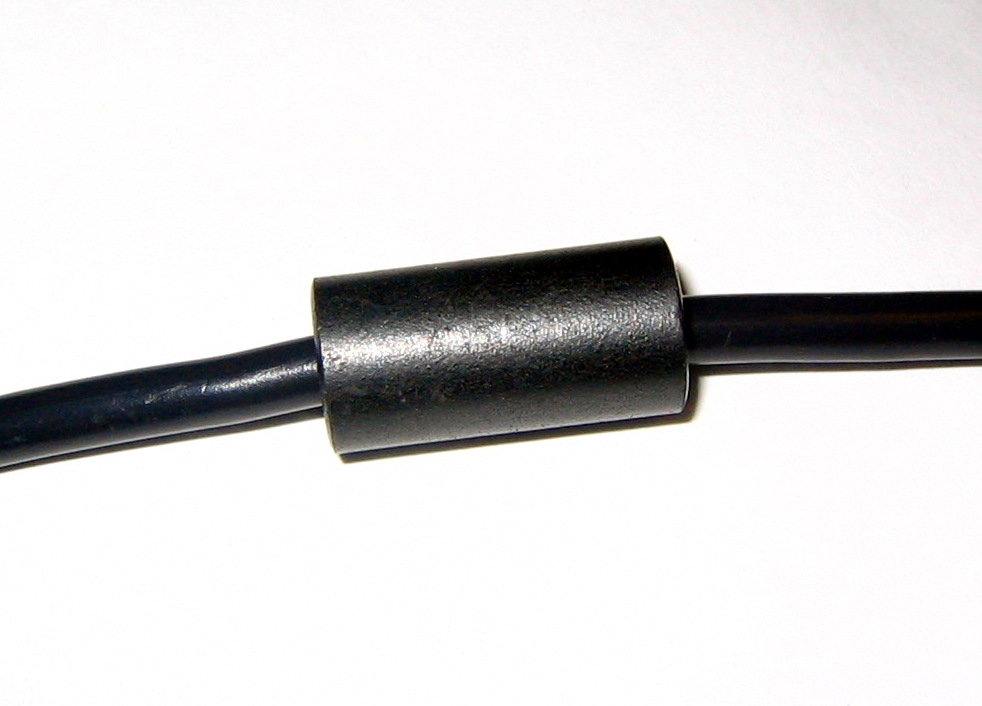
A ferrite "bead" choke, consisting of a cylinder of ferrite encircling a computer power cord to block electronic noise

Chokes are divided into two broad classes:

- Audio frequency chokes—designed to block audio and power line frequencies while allowing DC to pass
- Radio frequency chokes—designed to block radio frequencies while allowing audio and DC to pass.

=== Audio frequency choke ===
Audio frequency chokes usually have ferromagnetic cores to increase their inductance. They are often constructed similarly to transformers, with laminated iron cores and an air gap. The iron core increases the inductance for a given volume of the core. Chokes were frequently used in the design of rectifier power supplies for vacuum tube equipment such as radio receivers or amplifiers. They are commonly found in direct-current motor controllers to produce direct current (DC), where they were used in conjunction with large electrolytic capacitors to remove the voltage ripple (AC) at the output DC. A rectifier circuit designed for a choke-output filter may produce too much DC output voltage and subject the rectifier and filter capacitors to excessive in-rush and ripple currents if the inductor is removed. However, modern electrolytic capacitors with high ripple current ratings, and voltage regulators that remove more power supply ripple than chokes could, have eliminated heavy, bulky chokes from mains frequency power supplies. Smaller chokes are used in switching power supplies to remove the higher-frequency switching transients from the output and sometimes from feeding back into the mains input. They often have toroidal ferrite cores.

Some car audio hobbyists use choke coils with automobile audio systems (specifically in the wiring of a subwoofer, to remove high frequencies from the amplified signal).

=== Radio frequency choke ===
Radio frequency chokes (RFC) often have iron powder or ferrite cores which increases inductance and overall operation. They are often wound in complex patterns (basket winding) to reduce self-capacitance and proximity effect losses. Chokes for even higher frequencies have non-magnetic cores and low inductance.

A modern form of choke used for eliminating digital RF noise from lines is the ferrite bead, a cylindrical or torus-shaped core of ferrite slipped over a wire. These are often seen on computer cables.

=== Common-mode choke ===
A typical common-mode choke configuration. The common mode currents, i1 and i2, flowing in the same direction through each of the choke windings, creates equal and in-phase magnetic fields which add together. As a result, the choke presents a high impedance to the common mode signal.

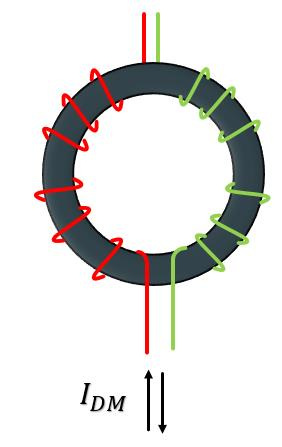
Common mode choke with differential current

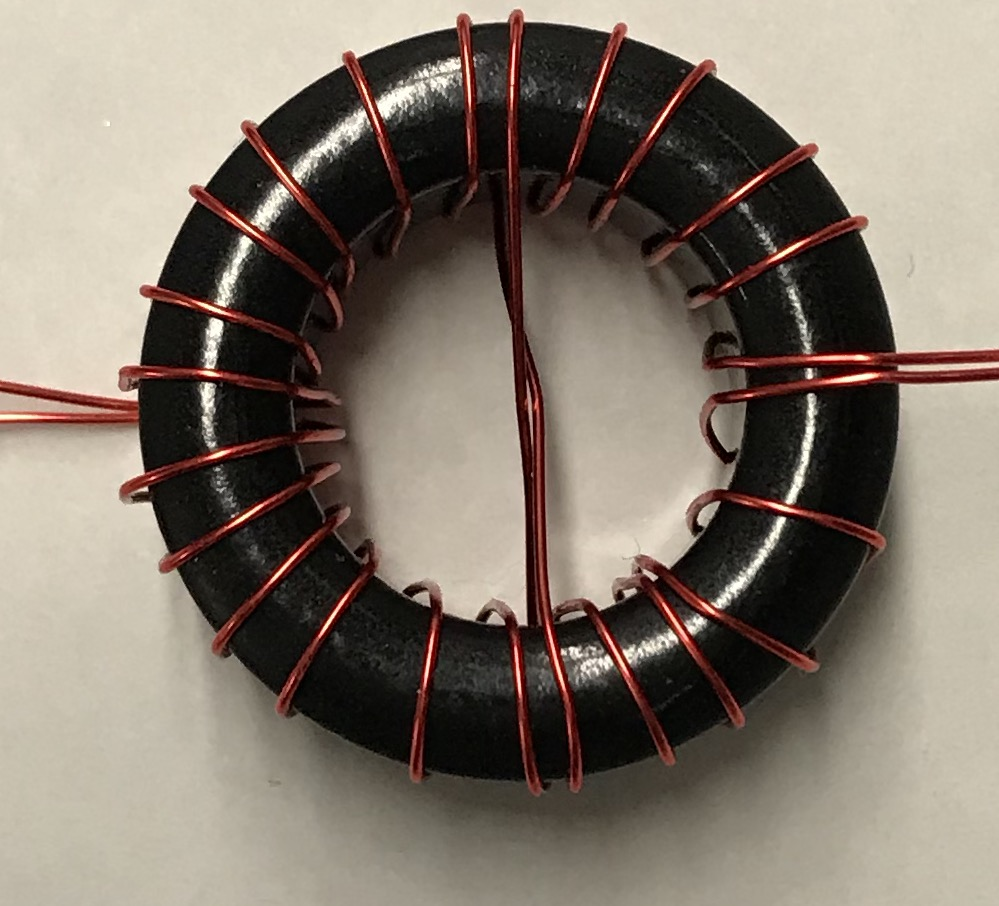
The prototype of the balanced twisted winding CM choke

A common-mode (CM) choke is a special application where a choke is used to act upon a common-mode signal. These chokes are useful for suppression of electromagnetic interference (EMI) and radio frequency interference (RFI) frequently introduced on high current wires such as on power supply lines, which may cause unwanted operation. Reducing this noise is frequently done by using a common mode choke—two parallel coil windings on a single core. Common mode chokes allow differential currents to pass while blocking signals that are affecting both wires. Because the magnetic flux produced by differential-mode currents in the core of a common mode choke tend to cancel each other out, the choke presents little impedance to differential mode currents. It achieves this by the placement of windings such that they generate equal but opposite fields that cancel each other out for differential mode signals. Normally this also means that the core will not saturate for large differential mode currents, and the maximum current rating is instead determined by the heating effect of the winding resistance. On the other hand, common mode currents see a high impedance path due to the combined inductance of the windings that reinforce each other.

CM chokes are commonly used in industrial, electrical and telecommunications applications to remove or decrease noise and related electromagnetic interference.

When the CM choke is conducting CM current, most of the magnetic flux generated by the windings is confined within the inductor core because of its high permeability. In this case, the leakage flux, which is also the near magnetic field emission of the CM choke is low. However, the differential-mode (DM) current flowing through the windings will generate high emitted near magnetic field since the windings are negative coupled in this case. To reduce the near magnetic field emission, a twisted winding structure can be applied to the CM choke.

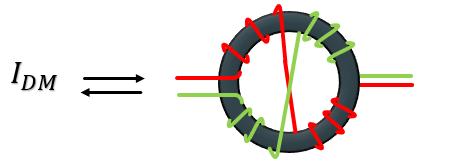
A balanced twisted windings CM choke

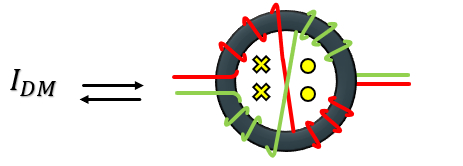
The equivalent current loops and the magnetic fields generated

The difference between the balanced twisted windings CM choke and conventional balanced two winding CM choke is that the windings interact in the center of the core open window. When it is conducting CM current, the balanced twisted winding CM inductor can provide identical CM inductance as the conventional CM inductor. When it is conducting DM current, the equivalent current loops will generate inversed direction magnetic fields in space so that they tend to cancel each other.

== See also ==
- Line reactor
- Waveguide choke - designed to enhance or inhibit propagation of specific modes in waveguides.
