= Electromagnetic interference =

Disturbance in an electrical circuit due to external sources of radio waves

Recording of US House of Representatives debate on October 8, 2002, interrupted and distorted by electromagnetic interference from a solar flare at approximately 2:30 p.m.

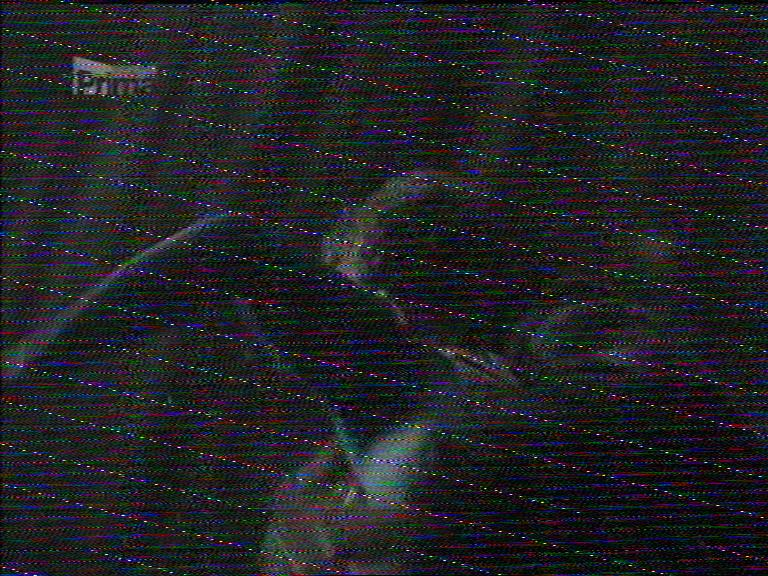
Electromagnetic interference in analogue TV signal

Electromagnetic interference (EMI), also called radio-frequency interference (RFI) when in the radio frequency spectrum, is a disturbance generated by an external source that affects an electrical circuit by electromagnetic induction, electrostatic coupling, or conduction. The disturbance may degrade the performance of the circuit or even stop it from functioning. In the case of a data path, these effects can range from an increase in error rate to a total loss of the data.

Both human-made and natural sources generate changing electrical currents and voltages that can cause EMI: ignition systems, cellular network of mobile phones, lightning, solar flares, and auroras (northern/southern lights). EMI frequently affects AM radios. It can also affect mobile phones, FM radios, and televisions, as well as observations for radio astronomy and atmospheric science.

EMI can be used intentionally for radio jamming, as in electronic warfare.

EMI sound sample 1
A GSM mobile phone signal interferes with a speaker system.

EMI sound sample 2
A Wi-Fi signal interferes with a speaker system.

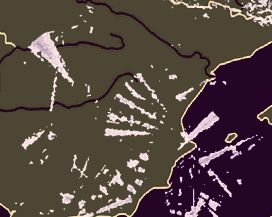
Interference by 5 GHz Wi-Fi seen on Doppler weather radar

== History ==
Since the earliest days of radio communications, the negative effects of interference from both intentional and unintentional transmissions have been felt and the need to manage the radio frequency spectrum became apparent.

In 1933, a meeting of the International Electrotechnical Commission (IEC) in Paris recommended the International Special Committee on Radio Interference (CISPR) be set up to deal with the emerging problem of EMI. CISPR subsequently produced technical publications covering measurement and test techniques and recommended emission and immunity limits. These have evolved over the decades and form the basis of much of the world's EMC regulations today.

In 1979, legal limits were imposed on electromagnetic emissions from all digital equipment by the FCC in the US in response to the increased number of digital systems that were interfering with wired and radio communications. Test methods and limits were based on CISPR publications, although similar limits were already enforced in parts of Europe.

In the mid 1980s, the European Union member states adopted a number of "new approach" directives with the intention of standardizing technical requirements for products so that they do not become a barrier to trade within the EC. One of these was the EMC Directive (89/336/EC) and it applies to all equipment placed on the market or taken into service. Its scope covers all apparatus "liable to cause electromagnetic disturbance or the performance of which is liable to be affected by such disturbance".

This was the first time there was a legal requirement on immunity, as well as emissions on apparatus intended for the general population. Although there may be additional costs involved for some products to give them a known level of immunity, it increases their perceived quality as they are able to co-exist with apparatus in the active EM environment of modern times and with fewer problems.

Many countries now have similar requirements for products to meet some level of electromagnetic compatibility (EMC) regulation.

== Types ==
Electromagnetic interference divides into several categories according to the source and signal characteristics.

The origin of interference, often called "noise" in this context, can be human-made (artificial) or natural.

Continuous, or continuous wave (CW), interference arises where the source continuously emits at a given range of frequencies. This type is naturally divided into sub-categories according to frequency range, and as a whole is sometimes referred to as "DC to daylight". One common classification is into narrowband and broadband, according to the spread of the frequency range.

- Audio frequency, from very low frequencies up to around 20 kHz. Frequencies up to 100 kHz may sometimes be classified as audio. Sources include:
  - Mains hum from: power supply units, nearby power supply wiring, transmission lines and substations.
  - Audio processing equipment, such as audio power amplifiers and loudspeakers.
  - Demodulation of a high-frequency carrier wave such as an FM radio transmission.
- Radio frequency interference (RFI), from typically 20 kHz to an upper limit which constantly increases as technology pushes it higher. Sources include:
  - Wireless and radio frequency transmissions
  - Television and radio receivers
  - Industrial, scientific and medical equipment (ISM)
  - Digital processing circuitry such as microcontrollers
  - Switched-mode power supplies (SMPS)
- Broadband noise may be spread across parts of either or both frequency ranges, with no particular frequency accentuated. Sources include:
  - Solar activity
  - Continuously operating spark gaps such as arc welders
  - CDMA (spread-spectrum) mobile telephony

An electromagnetic pulse (EMP), sometimes called a transient disturbance, arises where the source emits a short-duration pulse of energy. The energy is usually broadband by nature, although it often excites a relatively narrow-band damped sine wave response in the victim.

Sources divide broadly into isolated and repetitive events.

Sources of isolated EMP events include:

- Switching action of electrical circuitry, including inductive loads such as relays, solenoids, or electric motors.
- Power line surges/pulses
- Electrostatic discharge (ESD), as a result of two charged objects coming into close proximity or contact.
- Lightning electromagnetic pulse (LEMP), although typically a short series of pulses.
- Nuclear electromagnetic pulse (NEMP), as a result of a nuclear explosion. A variant of this is the high altitude EMP (HEMP) nuclear weapon, designed to create the pulse as its primary destructive effect.
- Non-nuclear electromagnetic pulse (NNEMP) weapons.

Sources of repetitive EMP events, sometimes as regular pulse trains, include:

- Electric motors
- Electrical ignition systems, such as in gasoline engines.
- Continual switching actions of digital electronic circuitry.

Conducted electromagnetic interference is caused by the physical contact of the conductors as opposed to radiated EMI, which is caused by induction (without physical contact of the conductors). Electromagnetic disturbances in the EM field of a conductor will no longer be confined to the surface of the conductor and will radiate away from it. This persists in all conductors and mutual inductance between two radiated electromagnetic fields will result in EMI.

=== Coupling mechanisms ===
The four electromagnetic interference (EMI) coupling modes

Some of the technical terms which are employed can be used with differing meanings. Some phenomena may be referred to by various different terms. These terms are used here in a widely accepted way, which is consistent with other articles in the encyclopedia.

The basic arrangement of noise emitter or source, coupling path and victim, receptor or sink is shown in the figure below. Source and victim are usually electronic hardware devices, though the source may be a natural phenomenon such as a lightning strike, electrostatic discharge (ESD) or, in one famous case, the Big Bang at the origin of the Universe.

There are four basic coupling mechanisms: conductive, capacitive, magnetic or inductive, and radiative. Any coupling path can be broken down into one or more of these coupling mechanisms working together. For example the lower path in the diagram involves inductive, conductive and capacitive modes.

Conductive coupling occurs when the coupling path between the source and victim is formed by direct electrical contact with a conducting body, for example a transmission line, wire, cable, PCB trace or metal enclosure. Conducted noise is also characterised by the way it appears on different conductors:

- Common-mode coupling: noise appears in phase (in the same direction) on two conductors.
- Differential-mode coupling: noise appears out of phase (in opposite directions) on two conductors.

Inductive coupling occurs where the source and victim are separated by a short distance (typically less than a wavelength). Strictly, "Inductive coupling" can be of two kinds, electrical induction and magnetic induction. It is common to refer to electrical induction as capacitive coupling, and to magnetic induction as inductive coupling.

Capacitive coupling occurs when a varying electrical field exists between two adjacent conductors typically less than a wavelength apart, inducing a change in voltage on the receiving conductor.

Inductive coupling or magnetic coupling occurs when a varying magnetic field exists between two parallel conductors typically less than a wavelength apart, inducing a change in voltage along the receiving conductor.

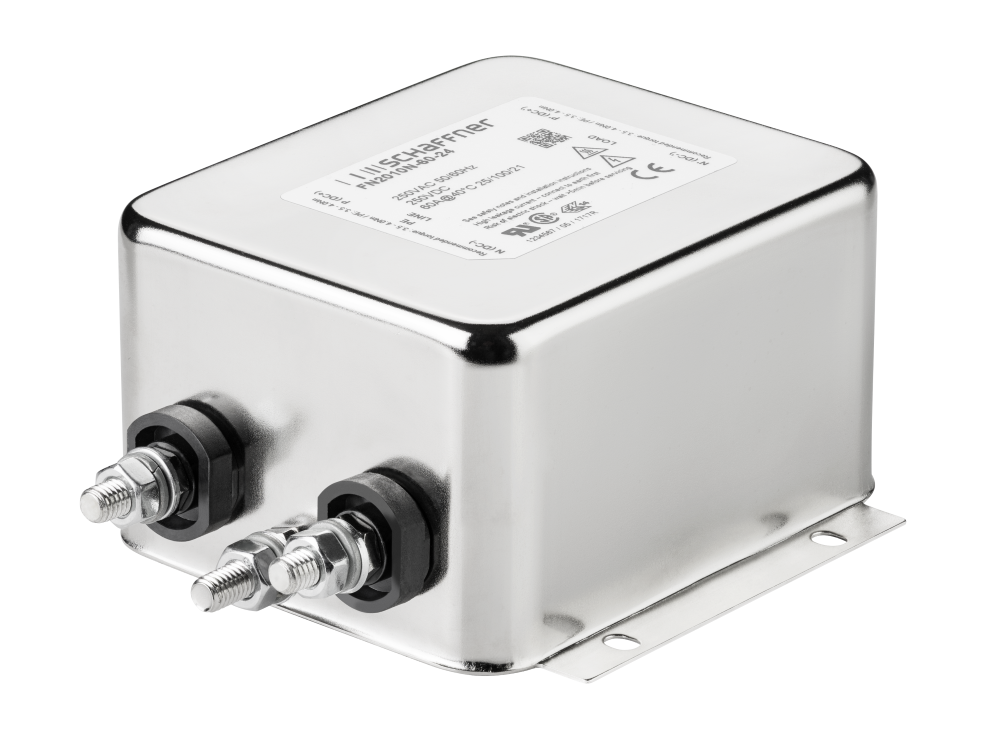
EMI filter for conducted emission suppression

Radiative coupling or electromagnetic coupling occurs when source and victim are separated by a large distance, typically more than a wavelength. Source and victim act as radio antennas: the source emits or radiates an electromagnetic wave which propagates across the space in between and is picked up or received by the victim.

== ITU definition ==
Interference with the meaning of electromagnetic interference, also radio-frequency interference (EMI or RFI) is – according to Article 1.166 of the International Telecommunication Union's (ITU) Radio Regulations (RR) – defined as "The effect of unwanted energy due to one or a combination of emissions, radiations, or inductions upon reception in a radiocommunication system, manifested by any performance degradation, misinterpretation, or loss of information which could be extracted in the absence of such unwanted energy".

This is also a definition used by the frequency administration to provide frequency assignments and assignment of frequency channels to radio stations or systems, as well as to analyze electromagnetic compatibility between radiocommunication services.

In accordance with ITU RR (article 1) variations of interference are classified as follows:

- permissible interference (RR 1.167)
- accepted interference (RR 1.168)
- harmful interference (RR 1.169)

== Conducted interference ==
Conducted EMI is caused by the physical contact of the conductors as opposed to radiated EMI which is caused by induction (without physical contact of the conductors).

For lower frequencies, EMI is caused by conduction and, for higher frequencies, by radiation.

EMI through the ground wire is also very common in an electrical facility.

== Susceptibilities of different radio technologies ==
Interference tends to be more troublesome with older radio technologies such as analogue amplitude modulation, which have no way of distinguishing unwanted in-band signals from the intended signal, and the omnidirectional antennas used with broadcast systems. Newer radio systems incorporate several improvements that enhance the selectivity. In digital radio systems, such as Wi-Fi, error-correction techniques can be used. Spread-spectrum and frequency-hopping techniques can be used with both analogue and digital signalling to improve resistance to interference. A highly directional receiver, such as a parabolic antenna or a diversity receiver, can be used to select one signal in space to the exclusion of others.

The most extreme example of digital spread-spectrum signalling to date is ultra-wideband (UWB), which proposes the use of large sections of the radio spectrum at low amplitudes to transmit high-bandwidth digital data. UWB, if used exclusively, would enable very efficient use of the spectrum, but users of non-UWB technology are not yet prepared to share the spectrum with the new system because of the interference it would cause to their receivers (the regulatory implications of UWB are discussed in the ultra-wideband article).

== Interference to consumer devices ==
In the United States, the 1982 Public Law 97-259 allowed the Federal Communications Commission (FCC) to regulate the susceptibility of consumer electronic equipment.

Potential sources of RFI and EMI include: various types of transmitters, doorbell transformers, toaster ovens, electric blankets, ultrasonic pest control devices, electric bug zappers, heating pads, and touch controlled lamps. Multiple CRT computer monitors or televisions sitting too close to one another can sometimes cause a "shimmy" effect in each other, due to the electromagnetic nature of their picture tubes, especially when one of their de-gaussing coils is activated.

Electromagnetic interference at 2.4 GHz may be caused by 802.11b, 802.11g and 802.11n wireless devices, Bluetooth devices, baby monitors and cordless telephones, video senders, and microwave ovens.

Switching loads (inductive, capacitive, and resistive), such as electric motors, transformers, heaters, lamps, ballast, power supplies, etc., all cause electromagnetic interference especially at currents above 2 A. The usual method used for suppressing EMI is by connecting a snubber network, a resistor in series with a capacitor, across a pair of contacts. While this may offer modest EMI reduction at very low currents, snubbers do not work at currents over 2 A with electromechanical contacts.

Another method for suppressing EMI is the use of ferrite core noise suppressors (or ferrite beads), which are inexpensive and which clip on to the power lead of the offending device or the compromised device.

Switched-mode power supplies can be a source of EMI, but have become less of a problem as design techniques have improved, such as integrated power factor correction.

Most countries have legal requirements that mandate electromagnetic compatibility: electronic and electrical hardware must still work correctly when subjected to certain amounts of EMI, and should not emit EMI, which could interfere with other equipment (such as radios).

Radio frequency signal quality has declined throughout the 21st century by roughly one decibel per year as the spectrum becomes increasingly crowded. This has inflicted a Red Queen's race on the mobile phone industry as companies have been forced to put up more cellular towers (at new frequencies) that then cause more interference thereby requiring more investment by the providers and frequent upgrades of mobile phones to match.

== Standards ==
The International Special Committee for Radio Interference or CISPR (French acronym for "Comité International Spécial des Perturbations Radioélectriques"), which is a committee of the International Electrotechnical Commission (IEC) sets international standards for radiated and conducted electromagnetic interference. These are civilian standards for domestic, commercial, industrial and automotive sectors. These standards form the basis of other national or regional standards, most notably the European Norms (EN) written by CENELEC (European committee for electrotechnical standardisation). US organizations include the Institute of Electrical and Electronics Engineers (IEEE), the American National Standards Institute (ANSI), and the US Military (MILSTD).

== EMI in integrated circuits ==
Integrated circuits are often a source of EMI, but they must usually couple their energy to larger objects such as heatsinks, circuit board planes and cables to radiate significantly.

On integrated circuits, important means of reducing EMI are: the use of bypass or decoupling capacitors on each active device (connected across the power supply, as close to the device as possible), rise time control of high-speed signals using series resistors, and IC power supply pin filtering. Shielding is usually a last resort after other techniques have failed, because of the added expense of shielding components such as conductive gaskets.

The efficiency of the radiation depends on the height above the ground plane or power plane (at RF, one is as good as the other) and the length of the conductor in relation to the wavelength of the signal component (fundamental frequency, harmonic or transient such as overshoot, undershoot or ringing). At lower frequencies, such as 133 MHz, radiation is almost exclusively via I/O cables; RF noise gets onto the power planes and is coupled to the line drivers via the VCC and GND pins. The RF is then coupled to the cable through the line driver as common-mode noise. Since the noise is common-mode, shielding has very little effect, even with differential pairs. The RF energy is capacitively coupled from the signal pair to the shield and the shield itself does the radiating. One cure for this is to use a braid-breaker or choke to reduce the common-mode signal.

At higher frequencies, usually above 500 MHz, traces get electrically longer and higher above the plane. Two techniques are used at these frequencies: wave shaping with series resistors and embedding the traces between the two planes. If all these measures still leave too much EMI, shielding such as RF gaskets and copper or conductive tape can be used. Most digital equipment is designed with metal or conductive-coated plastic cases.

=== RF immunity and testing ===
Any unshielded semiconductor (e.g. an integrated circuit) will tend to act as a detector for those radio signals commonly found in the domestic environment (e.g. mobile phones). Such a detector can demodulate the high frequency mobile phone carrier (e.g., GSM850 and GSM1900, GSM900 and GSM1800) and produce low-frequency (e.g., 217 Hz) demodulated signals. This demodulation manifests itself as unwanted audible buzz in audio appliances such as microphone amplifier, speaker amplifier, car radio, telephones etc. Adding onboard EMI filters or special layout techniques can help in bypassing EMI or improving RF immunity. Some ICs are designed (e.g., LMV831-LMV834, MAX9724) to have integrated RF filters or a special design that helps reduce any demodulation of high-frequency carrier.

Designers often need to carry out special tests for RF immunity of parts to be used in a system. These tests are often done in an anechoic chamber with a controlled RF environment where the test vectors produce a RF field similar to that produced in an actual environment.

== RFI in radio astronomy ==
Interference in radio astronomy, where it is commonly referred to as radio-frequency interference (RFI), is any source of transmission that is within the observed frequency band other than the celestial sources themselves. Because transmitters on and around the Earth can be many times stronger than the astronomical signal of interest, RFI is a major concern for performing radio astronomy.

Some of the frequency bands that are very important for radio astronomy, such as the 21-cm HI line at 1420 MHz, are protected by regulation. However, modern radio-astronomical observatories such as VLA, LOFAR, and ALMA have a very large bandwidth over which they can observe. Because of the limited spectral space at radio frequencies, these frequency bands cannot be completely allocated to radio astronomy; for example, redshifted images of the 21-cm line from the reionization epoch can overlap with the FM broadcast band (88–108 MHz), and therefore radio telescopes need to deal with RFI in this bandwidth.

Techniques to deal with RFI range from filters in hardware to advanced algorithms in software. One way to deal with strong transmitters is to filter out the frequency of the source completely. This is for example the case for the LOFAR observatory, which filters out the FM radio stations between 90 and 110 MHz. It is important to remove such strong sources of interference as soon as possible, because they might "saturate" the highly sensitive receivers (amplifiers and analogue-to-digital converters), which means that the received signal is stronger than the receiver can handle. However, filtering out a frequency band implies that these frequencies can never be observed with the instrument.

A common technique to deal with RFI within the observed frequency bandwidth, is to employ RFI detection in software. Such software can find samples in time, frequency or time-frequency space that are contaminated by an interfering source. These samples are subsequently ignored in further analysis of the observed data. This process is often referred to as data flagging. Because most transmitters have a small bandwidth and are not continuously present such as lightning or citizens' band (CB) radio devices, most of the data remains available for the astronomical analysis. However, data flagging can not solve issues with continuous broad-band transmitters, such as windmills, digital video or digital audio transmitters.

Another way to manage RFI is to establish a radio quiet zone (RQZ). RQZ is a well-defined area surrounding receivers that has special regulations to reduce RFI in favor of radio astronomy observations within the zone. The regulations may include special management of spectrum and power flux or power flux-density limitations. The controls within the zone may cover elements other than radio transmitters or radio devices. These include aircraft controls and control of unintentional radiators such as industrial, scientific and medical devices, vehicles, and power lines. The first RQZ for radio astronomy is United States National Radio Quiet Zone (NRQZ), established in 1958.

== RFI on environmental monitoring ==
Prior to the introduction of Wi-Fi, one of the biggest applications of 5 GHz band was the Terminal Doppler Weather Radar. The decision to use 5 GHz spectrum for Wi-Fi was finalized at the World Radiocommunication Conference in 2003; however, meteorological authorities were not involved in the process. The subsequent lax implementation and misconfiguration of DFS had caused significant disruption in weather radar operations in a number of countries around the world. In Hungary, the weather radar system was declared non-operational for more than a month. Due to the severity of interference, South African weather services ended up abandoning C band operation, switching their radar network to S band.

Transmissions on adjacent bands to those used by passive remote sensing, such as weather satellites, have caused interference, sometimes significant. There is concern that adoption of insufficiently regulated 5G could produce major interference issues. Significant interference can impair numerical weather prediction performance and incur negative economic and public safety impacts. These concerns led US Secretary of Commerce Wilbur Ross and NASA Administrator Jim Bridenstine in February 2019 to urge the FCC to cancel a proposed spectrum auction, which was rejected.

== See also ==
- Electromagnetic radiation
- Electromagnetic shielding
- Faraday cage
- Interference (communication)
- Power integrity
- Radio receiver
- Signal integrity
- Signal noise
- Twisted pair
