= TARC =

TARC may refer to:

- Taiwan Area Resident Certificate, an identification document for overseas Chinese and people from mainland China, Hong Kong, and Macau who reside in Taiwan
- Target Approval and Review Committee, a branch of the Canadian Security Intelligence Service
- Tax Administration Reform Commission, a committee appointed by the Government of India
- Team America Rocketry Challenge, now known as the American Rocketry Challenge, an American model rocketry competition for high school students
- The Amazing Race Canada, a Canadian TV-reality game
- Thymus and activation regulated chemokine, a gene which encodes a secreted protein of the immune system, also known as CCL17
- Total active reflection coefficient, a measure of multi-port radio antennas
- Transit Authority of River City, a major public transportation provider in Louisville, Kentucky, USA
- Truth and Reconciliation Commission (disambiguation), a government body tasked with uncovering past wrongdoing
- Tunku Abdul Rahman University College, in Malaysia
- Turkish Armenian Reconciliation Commission, an organisation established in 2001 to develop Armenia–Turkey relations
- Tyne Amateur Rowing Club, or Tyne Rowing Club, in Newcastle upon Tyne, UK
