= T2FD antenna =

General-purpose shortwave antenna

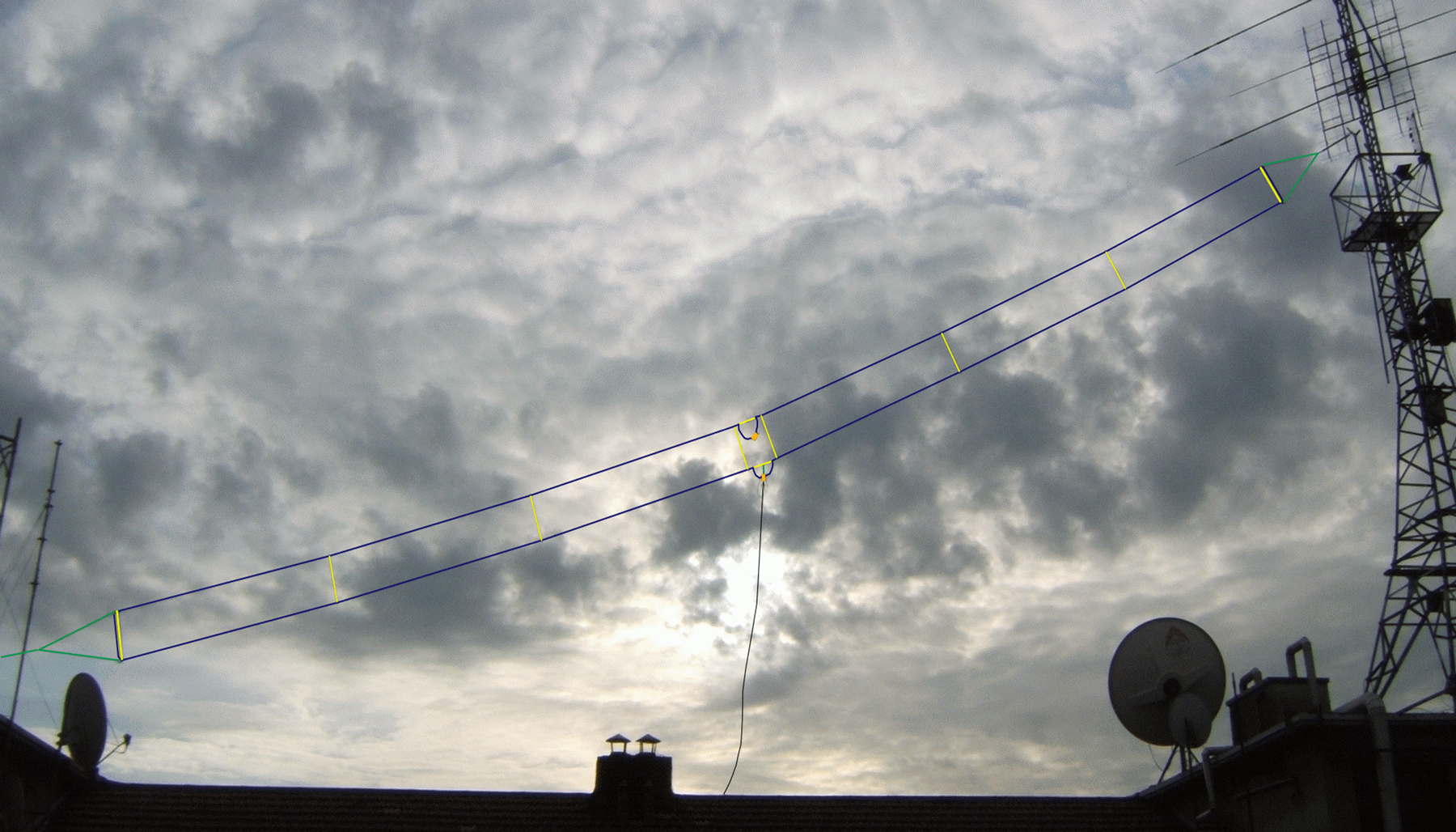
A 20-meter-long T^{2}FD antenna, covering the 5–30 MHz band

The tilted terminated folded dipole ('T^{2}FD, T2FD, or TTFD), or balanced-termination folded dipole (BTFD), also known as W3HH antenna, is a general-purpose shortwave antenna developed in the late 1940s by the United States Navy. It performs reasonably well over a broad frequency range, without marked dead spots in terms of frequency or horizontal or vertical directionality.

Although inferior in terms of efficiency compared to antennas designed for narrower frequency bands and those with greater directionality (at least 30% of the RF power is lost as heat in the resistor), its all-around performance, relatively modest size, and low cost, and the fact that it does not require complicated matching to operate with a standard shortwave transmitter, have made it popular in professional shortwave communications where ERP and gain are not concern. One example would be clear-channel low-power HF communications.

== History ==
The history of the T^{2}FD antenna divides conveniently into three different phases: It was first developed for use as a general-purpose antenna on naval ships in the 1940s. The design became public in the 1950s and was adopted by radio amateurs but later fell out of use with the advent of shorter wavelengths and the widespread adoption of low-impedance transmitters and antenna feeds. Recently, with the advent of multiple new frequency bands which are not even-integer multiples of existing bands’ frequencies, it has started to draw renewed attention from radio amateurs.

=== Origin ===
The T^{2}FD antenna was originally developed during WW II at the San Diego naval base for use on ships at sea, where antenna size is limited, but where the metal hull and salt water under the ship, or seaside station, makes an exceptionally good radio-frequency ground plane. The design properties of the antenna make it ideal for use in small spaces at long wavelengths, where no short antenna can be aimed in any particular direction, and where the number of antennas is limited and an exceedingly broad band of operating frequencies is needed.

=== Early amateur use ===
One of the developers of the original navy antenna, Captain G.L. Countryman, was an amateur radio enthusiast. He introduced the design to other amateurs at the beginning of the 1950s. It was a popular antenna design during the middle of the 20th century but fell out of common use during the latter part of the century with the growing popularity of upper HF and VHF bands, which needed dipoles with more feasible lengths – about 16 feet (4.9 m) or smaller, as opposed to quarter-wave antennas about 70 feet (21 m) long needed for the lower short-wave bands. Another factor contributing to its fall in popularity was the increasing use of low-impedance 50 Ω antenna feedline, which requires impedance matching at the T^{2}FD feedpoint.

=== Recent revival ===
Since the late 1980s, amateur radio operators and hobby shortwave listeners have used this antenna type more, especially for broadcast receiving and for amateur two-way modes such as Morse code and PSK31, where crude signal strength is not as important as a steady signal.

There have also been disputed claims that this antenna is comparatively insensitive to human-created radio interference; if true, that would make the design useful in urban environments, where a low noise floor is often more beneficial than high received signal strength. The T^{2}FD is useful for hidden indoor systems, or where several optimized frequency-specific antennas cannot be accommodated. For example, an indoor antenna only 24 feet long will allow transmitting on all amateur HF bands above 14 MHz and receiving down to 7 MHz.

== Construction ==
A typical shortwave radio reception T^{2}FD is built as follows, out of two parallel-wire conductors:

- The span is near half the wavelength of the lowest required frequency.
- The distance between the upper and lower conductors is 1/ 100 of the wavelength. This distance is maintained by a number of insulating dowels.
- At least two dowels at the ends are tied to non-conducting ropes, which in turn are tied to supports.
- The upper and lower ends of the conductors are connected at the ends, by wire sections that follow the end dowels.
- The antenna is fed in the middle of the lower conductor, with an impedance on the order of 300 Ω, balanced, through a standard 4:1 balun. This provides an acceptable all-frequency match to commonly available 75 Ω coaxial cable.
- It is terminated in the middle of the upper conductor with a 400–480 Ω non-inductive resistor, rated to safely absorb at least 1/3 of the applied transmitter power. The resistor absorbs a growing portion of the RF power (either captured from the air or supplied by a transmitter) as the operating frequency nears the lower limit of the design range. The resistor can be built of ten parallel sets of three 1,600 Ω, 1 W resistors, in series.
- In order to make it roughly omnidirectional, the antenna is ideally strung sloping at an angle of 20–40 degrees from horizontal but will also function satisfactorily if mounted horizontally, as long as it is suspended with minimal curvature.

The commercially available B&W AC3-30 and B&W DS1.8-30 antennas vary from the above to cover 3–30 MHz with a length of 90 feet (27 m) and spacing of 18 inches (460 mm) between the wires. The balun is a 16:1 ratio, thereby transforming the 50 Ω (ohm) coax to an 800 Ω feed at the antenna. The resistor load is also 800 Ω, non-inductive. This allows the antenna impedance to swing from 400 to 1,600 Ω over the frequency range intended and thus keep the standing wave ratio (SWR) at the transmitter 2:1 or lower.

== Applications and drawbacks ==
An antenna such as the one described above is usable for both local and medium-long-distance communication across a frequency range of about 1:6. For example, an antenna for the lower portion of shortwave (say, 3–18 MHz) will be roughly 33 metres (110 ft) long, with conductors spaced 1 metre (3 ft 3 in) apart. For the higher portion of shortwave (5–30 MHz), this antenna will be roughly 20 metres (66 ft) long, with a spacing of 60 centimetres (24 in). If such long spans cannot be accommodated, smaller antennas will still give adequate reception-only performance down to about half of their lowest design frequency.

Performance for transmission, however, degrades rapidly below a certain point. Tests done by J.S. Belrose (1994) showed that though the conventional T^{2}FD length is close to a full-size 80 meter (3.5–4.0 MHz) antenna, the antenna starts to suffer serious signal loss, in both transmission and reception, below 10 MHz (above 30 m), with 80-meter-band signals reduced by 10 dB (90%) compared to a reference dipole at 10 MHz.

As a broadband antenna, the T^{2}FD will normally display a reasonably low standing wave ratio (SWR) across its entire frequency range. However, at some frequencies the antenna feedpoint may be moderately reactive, so the use of an antenna tuner may be needed when using modern solid-state transmitters at anything approaching their rated power output.

A low SWR does not imply high antenna efficiency. This antenna is not recommended for those wanting to make challenging long-distance signal contacts with limited power (e.g. the new U.K. limit of 1,000 W, or the U.S. amateur limit of 1,500 W). At shortwave frequencies, a dipole cut for the longest used wavelength, fed with ladder line and matched with an antenna tuner, would make better use of the applied power than the T^{2}FD.

Many ready-made commercial versions of the T^{2}FD are available for the professional, military, amateur radio, and hobby listening markets.
