= RigExpert =

Ukrainian electronics manufacturer

Rig Expert Ukraine Ltd
- Founded: 2003; 22 years ago in Kyiv, Ukraine
- Headquarters: Kyiv
- Products: Antenna analyzer, Antenna tuner
- Website: www.rigexpert.com

Rig Expert Ukraine Ltd is a manufacturer of ham and PMR Two-way radio RF antenna analysis and antenna tuning equipment. The company was founded in 2003 and is headquartered in Kyiv, Ukraine.

== Current products ==
The AA-30, AA-54 & AA-170 are almost the same product except for the frequency range. Similarly, the AA-600, AA-1000 & AA-1400 are the same product except for the different frequency range.

Model	Freq. Range
AA30	0.1 - 30 MHz
AA-54	0.1 - 54 MHz
AA-55 Zoom	0.1 - 55 MHz
AA-170	0.1 - 170 MHz
AA-600	0.1 - 600 MHz
AA-1000	0.1 – 1 GHz
AA-1400	0.1 - 1.4 GHz

== See also ==
- Antenna analyzer
- Antenna tuner
- Impedance matching
