= Shortwave broadband antenna =

Radio signal transmission equipment

A shortwave broadband antenna is a radio antenna that can be used for transmission (and reception) of any shortwave radio band from among the greater part of the shortwave radio spectrum, without requiring any band-by-band adjustment of the antenna. Generally speaking, there is no difficulty in building an adequate receiving antenna; the challenge is designing an antenna which can be used for transmission without an adjustable impedance matching network.

An ideal “broadband” shortwave antenna would work continuously across much of, if not all of, the shortwave spectrum with good radiation efficiency and minimal compromise of the radiation pattern. Most practical broadband antennas compromise on one of the above: Either they only work on a few relatively narrow slices of the HF radio spectrum, or they work across the complete spectrum, without gaps, but are inefficient radiators on some or all of the frequencies. Other antennas provide adequate efficiency on some frequencies, but require a separate antenna tuner to function on others. A few designs remain omnidirectional on all frequencies but most “beam” antennas lose their directionality.

== Background ==
At the lower shortwave frequencies e.g. 1.8 MHz, the antennas need to be physically large to enable good coupling to "space" and hence efficient radiation. As an example, at 5 MHz a half wave dipole antenna is around 27 meters long (90 ft.), at 3.5 MHz nearly 41 meters (133 ft.), and 2 MHz it is 71 meters long (234 ft.). Half-wave horizontal dipoles are efficient radiators, if they are about half their length above ground or higher; if low to the ground relative to wavelength then horizontal dipoles suffer from large loss of signal in the earth and are inefficient radiators, despite their adequate length. (Note: “... Table 1 – Dipole performance over average ground ... ‘So, what is the “bottom line?’ ... Effectively, almost any horizontal antenna configuration for 160 meters is going to be a high-angle radiator ...” — Gary Wescom (2006)) Half wave dipoles are narrow band (only work over a very small frequency range) before serious impedance mismatch occurs. This mismatch can be accommodated by an antenna tuner, but those add to costs, and are ineffective for broad-jump frequency hopping techniques used in some modern shortwave communication systems. Even automatic antenna tuners will not work with frequency hopping signals.

A less ambitious idea of “wideband antenna” (often also called “broadband”) is an antenna that continuously covers the proportionally widest amateur band, that spans 3.5–4.0 MHz (a 14% relative bandwidth), (Note: For the purpose of comparing RF performance, “widest” means the largest ratio of high to low frequency, not the largest difference in frequencies.) without requiring an antenna tuner. There are many such designs, but those are not discussed here. (Note: Many "broadband" designs used by the amateur radio enthusiasts are technically not "true" broadband antennas, as they are finely-tuned to only transmit well without an antenna tuner in a sequence of nearly harmonic amateur bands; but good transmission on harmonics is generally expected of any resonant antenna. Their only remarkable property is that the harmonic resonances have been carefully nudged to occur inside amateur frequency bands, which themselves are not quite spaced in an exactly harmonic sequence.)

Broadband shortwave base antennas traditionally fall into two main categories:

- Resistively loaded antennas which can be inexpensive and reasonably compact but inefficient on their lower frequencies.
- Large elaborate and very expensive, non-loaded designs (which cost upwards of $80,000 to purchase and install).

The challenge for many years has been to devise an antenna which is an efficient radiator, compact, and also inexpensive. Previous solutions include the Barker-Williamson folded dipole, the ‘Australian’ traveling-wave antenna, (Note: Graham Robinson founded the Perth-based Bushcomm antenna company, which builds and sells various Robinson-Barnes antennas.) and other designs by Guertler etc.

Some shortwave broadband antennas can even be used on the whole vaguely defined "shortwave" radio spectrum (usually 1.6–30 MHz) which consists of the upper part of the medium waves (MF band upper section = 1.6–3 MHz) and the whole of the high frequencies (HF band = 3–30 MHz).

=== Vocabulary: "Broadband", "multiband", and "wideband" ===
There are two separate issues related to getting as many frequencies as possible out of an antenna:

1. The antenna can have a large relative span of tolerably well-transmitted frequencies between some lower frequency and upper frequency, with no gaps in coverage between the two. In this sense, coverage is "broad" because the continuously covered span of workable frequencies is large.
2. The antenna can transmit well on a number of different, separate frequencies: The better antenna has the separate frequencies spaced closest together. For resonant antennas, some of any one antenna type’s harmonics may not be feasible for transmission, so an antenna that is usable on more of its harmonics will be more versatile.

Clearly, the optimum imaginable antenna would have both good traits, but achieving even one is a challenge, and achieving both is rarely possible with a single antenna, and essentially impossible with anything but an infeasibly large, expensive antenna. Further, different authors use the words "broadband", "multiband", and "wideband" to mean one definition or the other, but the use of the words is inconsistent. Although "multiband" fairly unambiguously refers to meaning 2, both "broadband" and "wideband" are used erratically to refer to either of the two meanings. The reader needs to be aware of the two different issues, with two different words chosen by each author to designate them; either that or an author's description of an individual antenna design may use any of these three words, or others, but only address one of the issues.

== Examples ==
fan dipole
also called a multi-dipole, is a common dipole variant that has several dipole arms of different lengths radiating from the combined antenna's central connection point (⪫⪪ ⫸⫷) resembling a "bow-tie" antenna. The basic idea is that the feed current naturally flows mostly into whichever piece of wire offers the lowest impedance (best match) at the frequency being fed, and the lengths of the fanned dipole sections are specifically selected for a set of desired frequencies.

The multiple dipoles make the combined antenna wider-band than a simple two-arm dipole; the wires spreading from the bow-tie feedpoint are connected in matching pairs, each pair a different length, give the dipole a wider range of resonances. If the several dipole pairs are near the same length, the antenna will show a continuous range of matched-impedance frequencies wider than any one dipole. If the dipole pairs' lengths have wider size differences, the fan dipole will show multiple distinct resonant frequencies, with at least one extra resonance for each additional pair.

tilted terminated folded dipole (T²FD)
Its all-around performance, relatively modest size, low cost, and the fact that it does not require any electronic matching to operate with a standard shortwave transmitter, have made it popular in professional shortwave communications, where unrestricted high power can be used to compensate for losses in the antenna's terminating resistor.

log-periodic antenna
The log periodic is commonly used in high power short wave broadcasting where it is desired to invest in only a single antenna to cover transmissions over multiple frequencies. It is the only type of directional antenna that is directional (a "beam" antenna) over its entire working range.

discone antenna
The discone is omnidirectional, vertically polarized, and has a gain similar to a dipole. It is equally efficient as a monopole and is exceptionally wideband, offering a frequency range ratio of up to approximately 10:1 . It is a monopole version of a biconical antenna.

traveling-wave antenna
An advantage of traveling wave antennas is that since they are non-resonant, they often have a wider bandwidth than resonant antennas. The disadvantage is that since they are typically two or more wavelengths long, they require a large open space; further, the great lengths make steering them infeasible, so one must be erected for each desired signal direction.

terminated coaxial cage monopole
The TC²M is a vertical polarized broadband shortwave antenna. The antenna can be characterized by being a vertical traveling-wave coaxially caged monopole over a ground plane, or alternatively described as a folded unipole with a terminating resistor.

off-center fed dipole antennas
Often called “Windom” antennas – By carefully selecting the feedpoint position at some distance close to 1/3 of the length of a half-wavelength wire, its feedpoint impedance is nearly constant for a variety of nearly-harmonic frequencies of the half-wave frequency. All Windom-style antennas have expansive coverage gaps between their nearly-harmonic working frequencies, including a few harmonics which manifest as antiresonances. Fine adjustments of the feedpoint position, varying the position and length of the antenna, and adding loading stubs near its center can all shift the positions of feasible frequencies, and / or insert more frequencies into the list.

Among this family of off-center-fed designs are
- “Carolina Windom” (deliberately exploits feedline radiation),
- K5GP antenna (center loading for low bands),
- ON4AA antenna (center-loaded to add a sixth band).

Robinson-Barnes antenna
A restively terminated antenna designed and developed in the early 1990s by Graham Robinson and John Barnes, that has gained some attention for its wide 4 octave bandwidth (2–30 MHz). One antenna can cover essentially the whole shortwave band – useful for commercial and military stations with limited ground space, which can compensate for low efficiency with high power. It is generally tower mounted, either horizontally or as an "inverted V" antenna, and has two outer radiating elements and a third, middle element with a center termination, essentially the same as a T²FD whose long wire has been doubled.

== See also ==
- Antenna tuner
- Shortwave radio receiver
