= Preselector =

Radio signal filtering device

Circuit of a very simple preselector. For any one frequency, using a larger tuning coil results in a narrower bandwidth, i.e. greater rejection of out-of-tune signals.

A preselector is a name for an electronic device that connects between a radio antenna and a radio receiver. The preselector is an adjustable band-pass filter that blocks troublesome out-of-tune frequencies from passing through from the antenna into the radio receiver or preamplifier that otherwise would be directly connected to the antenna.

== Purpose ==
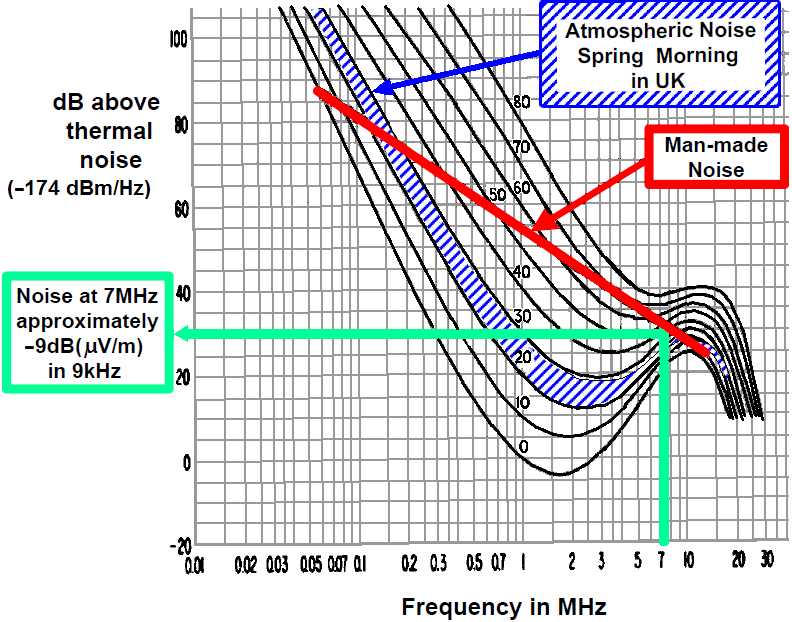
Preselectors become increasingly helpful at lower shortwave and mediumwave frequenies, where noise of all kinds becomes drasticly louder. This log-log plot is taken from ITU CCIR Report 322; it shows typical ranges of interference (signal power) for atmospheric and human-made radio noise. The graph shows that noise is high for frequencies below 20 MHz, and that both human-caused noise (red, "interference", "QRM") and natural noise (blue, "static", "QRN") both grow more than exponentially louder as frequency drops below about 1.5 MHz.

A preselector improves the performance of nearly any receiver, but is especially helpful (Note: Despite being helpful for reducing off-frequency interference on relatively wideband antennas, such as dipoles and random wire antennas, a preselector provides little or no benefit to receivers or preamps when they are fed from a narrow-band source, such as a tuned small loop antenna.) to receivers with broadband front-ends that are prone to overload, such as scanners, wideband software-defined radio receivers, ordinary consumer-market shortwave and AM broadcast receivers – particularly with receivers operating on frequencies where static is pervasive – below 10~20 MHz (lower-frequency half of the short waves, and all of medium waves, long waves, and longer wavelengths). Sometimes faint signals that occupy a very narrow frequency span (such as radiotelegraph or 'CW') can be heard more clearly if the receiving bandwidth is made narrower than the narrowest that a general-purpose receiver may be able to tune; likewise, signals which individually use a fairly wide span of frequencies, such as broadcast AM, can be made less noisy by narrowing the bandwidth of the signal, even though making the span of received frequencies narrower than was transmitted will sacrifice some audio fidelity. A good preselector often can reduce a radio's receive bandwidth to a narrower frequency span than many general-purpose radios can manage on their own.

A preselector typically is tuned to have a narrow bandwidth, centered on the receiver's operating frequency. The preselector passes through the signal on its tuned frequency unchanged (or only slightly diminished) but it greatly reduces or removes off-frequency signals, cutting down or eliminating unwanted interference. (Note: Note that a preselector cannot remove any interference that comes through on the same frequency that it and the receiver are both tuned to.)

Frequency response curves for a simple preselector tuned by a capacitor set to 10, 30, 100, or 300 pF; the inductor is near 160 μH.

Extra filtering can be useful because the first input stage ("front end") of receivers contains at least one RF amplifier, which has power limits ("dynamic range"). Most radios' front ends amplify all radio frequencies delivered to the antenna connection. So off-frequency signals constitute a load on the RF amplifier, wasting part of its dynamic range on unwanted and unused signals. "Limited dynamic range" means that the amplifier circuits have a limit to the total amount of incoming RF signal they can amplify without overloading; symptoms of overload are nonlinearity (tonal "distortion") and ultimately clipping ("buzz").

When the front-end overloads the performance of the receiver is severely reduced, and in extreme cases can damage the receiver. In situations with noisy and crowded bands, or where there is loud interference from nearby, high-power stations, the dynamic range of the receiver can quickly be exceeded. Extra filtering by the preselector limits frequency range and power demands that are applied to all later stages of the receiver, only loading it with the desired signals within the preselector's pass-band.

=== Preselect filter bank ===
Spectrum analyzers, heavy-duty network analyzers, and other RF measuring equipment can incorporate switchable banks of preselector circuits individually similar to preselector circuits in conventional radios, that reject out-of-band noise at the frequencies being analyzed. Automatically switched and tuned filter banks can likewise be incorporated into various high quality, general purpose, broadband receivers.

=== Multifunction preselectors ===
A preselector may be engineered with extra features, so that in addition to attenuating interference from unwanted frequencies it can provide additional services which may be helpful for a receiver:

- It can limit signal input voltage to protect a sensitive receiver from damage caused by static discharge, nearby voltage spikes, and overload from nearby transmitters' signals.
- It can provide a DC path to ground, to drain off noisy static charge that tends to collect on the antenna when dry or dusty wind or snow blows across its metal surface.
- It can also incorporate a small radio frequency amplifier stage to boost the filtered signal.

None of these extra conveniences are necessary for the function of preselection, and in particular, for the typical noisy frequency bands where a preselector is needed, an amplifier in the preselector has no useful function.

On the other hand, when an antenna preamplifier (preamp) is actually needed, (Note: One example of a need for a preamp would be the relatively rare case of a remote receiving antenna, perhaps placed on a hilltop over a mile from the listening post. A well-placed remote antenna can both provide a clear line-of-sight for signals blocked by surrounding terrain, and can keep the receiving antenna far from some local noise source, if any, like the generator used to power a remote radio installation. If the feedline is exceptionally long it can both suffer signal signal loss from resistance in the wire, and a feedline can act like a long wire antenna, collecting local and remote interference over a long run. A modest preamp placed at the antenna (powered via DC through the feedline) can amplify the "clean" signal directly off the antenna, so that the boosted signal is able to travel a long distance without noticeable power loss, nor pickup enough interference to affect the louder amplified signal.) it can be made "tunable" by incorporating a front-end preselector circuit to improve its performance. The integrated device is both a preamplifier and a preselector, and either name is correct. This ambiguity sometimes leads to confusion – conflating preselection with amplification.

Ordinary, regular preselectors (that are just preselectors) contain no amplifier: They are entirely passive devices. A standard, ordinary preselector, with no amplifier, sometimes has the word "passive" prefixed – hence "passive preselector" means "standard preselector". Since preselectors are normally "passive", adding the redundant word is pedantic, but even so, emphasizes to those only familiar with tunable preamplifiers that the "passive" preselector has no internal amplifier and does not require any power source.

In the noisy longwave, mediumwave, and shortwave bands where preselectors are typically used, when used with "modern" (post-1940) receivers (Note: An example of "modern" radios that need no preamp in the preselector are the now nearly-universal heterodyne and superheterodyne designs. A regenerative receiver is an old circuit design that may benefit from a preamplifier, separate from the radio, inside the preselector.) they function with no noticeable loss of signal strength.

== Bandwidth vs. signal strength trade-off ==
With all preselectors there is some very small loss at the tuned frequency; usually, most of the loss is in the inductor (the tuning coil). Turning up the inductance gives the preselector a narrower bandwidth (or higher Q, or greater selectivity) and slightly raises the loss, which nonetheless is still very small.

Most preselectors have separate settings for one inductor and one capacitor (at least). (Note: The setting dials may be labeled as "Band" (inductor, possibly also selection of a capacitor bank) and "Tune" (capacitor, or extra capacitance for fine-tuning). Regardless of the labeling, if one frequency admits more than one setting for the tuning controls, those settings' bandwidths, output and input impedances, and other electrical properties will all differ at least slightly.) So with at least two adjustments available to tune to just one frequency, there are often a variety of possible settings that will tune the preselector to frequencies in its middle-range.

For the narrowest bandwidth (highest Q), the preselector is tuned using the highest inductance and lowest capacitance for the desired frequency, but this produces the greatest loss. It also requires retuning the preselector more often while searching for faint signals, to keep the preselector's pass band overlapping the radio's receiving frequency.

For lowest loss (and widest bandwidth), the preselector is tuned using the lowest viable inductance and highest capacitance (and the lowest Q, or least selectivity) for the desired frequency range. The wider bandwidth allows more interference through from nearby frequencies, but reduces the need to retune the preselector while tuning the receiver, since any one low-inductance setting for the preselector will pass a broader span of nearby frequencies.

Typically, the radio operator alternates a preselector's bandwidth between wide and narrow: Wide-band (low inductance, high capacitance, lowest Q) while searching for signals, and then re-adjusted to narrow-band (high inductance, low capacitance, highest Q) to closely inspect an interesting signal.

== Different from an antenna tuner ==
Although a preselector is placed between the radio and the antenna, in the same electrical location as a feedline matching unit, it serves a different purpose: A transmatch or "antenna" tuner connects two transmission lines with different impedances and only incidentally blocks out-of-tune frequencies (if it blocks any at all).

A transmatch matches transmitter impedance to feedline impedance and phase, so that signal power from the radio transmitter smoothly transfers into the antenna's feed cable; a properly adjusted transmatch prevents transmitted power from being reflected back into the transmitter ("backlash current"). Some antenna tuner circuits can both impedance match and preselect, for example the Series Parallel Capacitor (SPC) tuner, and many 'tuned-transformer'-type matching circuits used in many balanced line tuners (BLT) can be adjusted to also function as band-pass filters. (Note: Some simpler types of antenna tuners that are not band-pass circuits can also provide limited preselection. The now-common C L C-type 'T'‑network is a high-pass circuit which always essentially eliminates frequencies below the operating frequency, but even when adjusted for greatest selectivity, cannot block higher frequencies nearly as well as a conventional preselector. It can, however, be adjusted for high operating Q that might attenuate noise above the operating frequency by as much as 20 dB. The complementary 'π'-network is a low-pass circuit that is also used for impedance matching. It will always block essentially all signals above the matched frequency, and if desired, a 'π'-network can be adjusted similarly a 'T'‑network, to provide attenuation below the matched frequency by as much as 20 dB. 'Vintage' tube transmitters and amplifiers normally incorporated 'π'-networks into their final stages, both for impedance matching and blocking harmonics. Although currently not as popular as 'T'-networks for impedance matching, a 'π'-network is preferred by many radio operators, since all are required by their operating license to not interfere with other signals. The usual main concern is interference from a transmitter or amplifier generating loud harmonics. Since harmonics are double, triple, etc. the transmitted frequency, they occur so far away from the transmitted signal that radio operators listening to their signals on the transmit frequency can easily be unaware of the interference they are causing on much higher frequencies. For this particular kind of interference, the 'π'-network is a welcome fail-safe, since it blocks nearly all inadvertent transmissions above the transmit frequency its impedance matching is adjusted for.)

== See also ==
- Antenna tuner
- Band-pass filter
