= Active reflection coefficient =

The active reflection coefficient (ARC) is the reflection coefficient for a single antenna element in an array antenna, in the presence of mutual coupling. The active reflection coefficient is a function of frequency in addition to the excitation of the neighboring cells. In computational electromagnetics, the active reflection coefficient is usually determined from unit cell analysis in the frequency domain, where the phase shift over the unit cell (progressive phase shift used to steer the beam) is applied as a boundary condition. It has been suggested that the name "scan reflection coefficient" is more appropriate than "active reflection coefficient", however the latter remains the most commonly used name.

== Mathematical description ==
=== General case ===
The ARC for antenna element $m$ in an array of $N$ elements is calculated by:

$\Gamma_S = \sum_{n = 1}^N S_{mn} \frac{a_{n}}{a_{m}},$

where $a_n$ are the excitation coefficients and $S_{mn}$ are the coupling coefficients.

=== Linear array with specified scan angle ===
In a linear array with inter element spacing $a$, uniform amplitude tapering and scan angle $\theta_0$, the following excitation coefficients are used: $a_n = e^{-jkna \sin\theta_0}$. By inserting this expression into the general equation above, we obtain:

$\Gamma_S(\theta_0) = e^{jkma \sin\theta_0} \sum_{n = 1}^N S_{mn} e^{-jkna \sin\theta_0}.$

== See also ==
- Total active reflection coefficient
- Array antenna
