= Target Approval and Review Committee =

A branch of the Canadian Security Intelligence Service (CSIS), the Target Approval and Review Committee (TARC) grants or denies the ability to put a suspect or group under surveillance and open a clandestine investigation. It is chaired by the Director of CSIS (currently Daniel Rogers as of 2024), senior CSIS officers and representatives from the Department of Justice and Deputy Minister of Public Safety and Emergency Preparedness.

In March 1991, TARC amended their previous regulations, and included a requirement that the Solicitor General must be consulted before allowing any investigation.

"The range of investigative techniques to be deployed under this authorization will be subject to consultation with the Minister."

From this point on, the Service was required to send an aide-mémoire to the Solicitor General - prior to implementing the TARC Certificate.

== Levels of investigation ==
There are three levels of possible allowance.

- Level 1

The first level allows agents to begin a short-term investigation consisting of collecting public records, and applying to foreign police, security and intelligence organizations for further information on a subject.

- Level 2

The second level allows agents the right to conduct personal interviews with individuals acquainted with the subject or group, and to physically follow the subject's movements.

- Level 3

The third level allows agents "intrusive" measures.

== Notable instances ==
- On October 3, 1989, noted right-wing neo-Nazi Wolfgang Droege, became the subject of a TARC Level 2.

== Similar arms of CSIS ==
The Warrant Review Committee is made up of the same members as TARC, but includes the addition of an independent counsel - and is designed to defend warrant applications before the Federal Court of Canada.
