= Tax Administration Reform Commission =

The Tax Administration Reform Commission or TARC is committee appointed by the Government of India for giving recommendations for reviewing the public Tax Administration system of India. The Union Finance Minister had made an announcement in his Budget Speech 2013-14 for setting up of Tax Administration Reform Commission (TARC) to review the application of tax policies and tax laws in India in the context of global best practices, and to recommend measures for reforms required in tax administration. Accordingly, TARC was established vide the Government of India Notification dated 21 August 2013. The term of the Commission is 18 months and works as an advisory body to the Ministry of Finance. The Commission has given its first set of recommendations to the new government. Dr. Parthasarathi Shome is Adviser (at the level of Minister of State) to the Indian Finance Minister, 2013. He was appointed Chairman of the Tax Administration Reforms Commission (TARC), Government of India (August 2013)

== Mandate ==
1. To review the existing organizational structure and recommend appropriate enhancements with special reference to deployment of workforce commensurate with functional requirements, capacity building, vigilance administration, responsibility and accountability of human resources, key performance indicators, staff assessment, grading and promotion systems, and structures to promote quality decision-making at high policy levels.
2. To review the existing business processes of tax administration including the use of information and communication technology and recommend measures best suited to the Indian context.
3. To review the existing mechanism of dispute resolution, time involved for resolution, and compliance cost and recommend measures for strengthening the process. This includes domestic and international taxation.
4. To review the existing mechanism and recommend capacity building measures for preparing impact assessment statements on taxpayers compliance cost of new policy and administrative measures of the tax Departments.
5. To review the existing mechanism and recommend measures for deepening and widening of tax base and taxpayer base.
6. To review the existing mechanism and recommend a system to enforce better tax compliance – by size, segment and nature of taxes and taxpayers, that should cover methods to encourage voluntary tax compliance.
7. To review existing mechanism and recommend measures for improved taxpayer services and taxpayers education programme. This includes mechanism for grievance redressal, simplified and timely disbursal of duty drawback, export incentives, rectification procedures and refunds etc.
8. To review the existing mechanism and recommend measures for “Capacity building” in emerging areas of Customs administration relating to Border Control, National Security, International Data Exchange and securing of supply chains.
9. To review the existing mechanism and recommend measures for strengthening of Database and inter-agency information sharing, not only between Central Board of Direct Taxes (CBDT) and Central Board of Excise and Customs (CBEC) but also with the banking and financial sector, Central Economic Intelligence Bureau (CEIB), Financial Intelligence Unit (FIU), Enforcement Directorate etc. and use of tools for utilization of such information to ensure compliance.
10. To review the existing mechanism and recommend appropriate means including staff resources for forecasting, analyzing and monitoring of revenue targets.
11. To review the existing policy and recommend measures for research inputs to tax governance.
12. To review the existing mechanism and recommend measures to enhance predictive analysis to detect and prevent tax/economic offences.
13. Any other issue which the government may specify during the tenure of the Commission.
