= SWR meter =

Measurement device for radio equipment

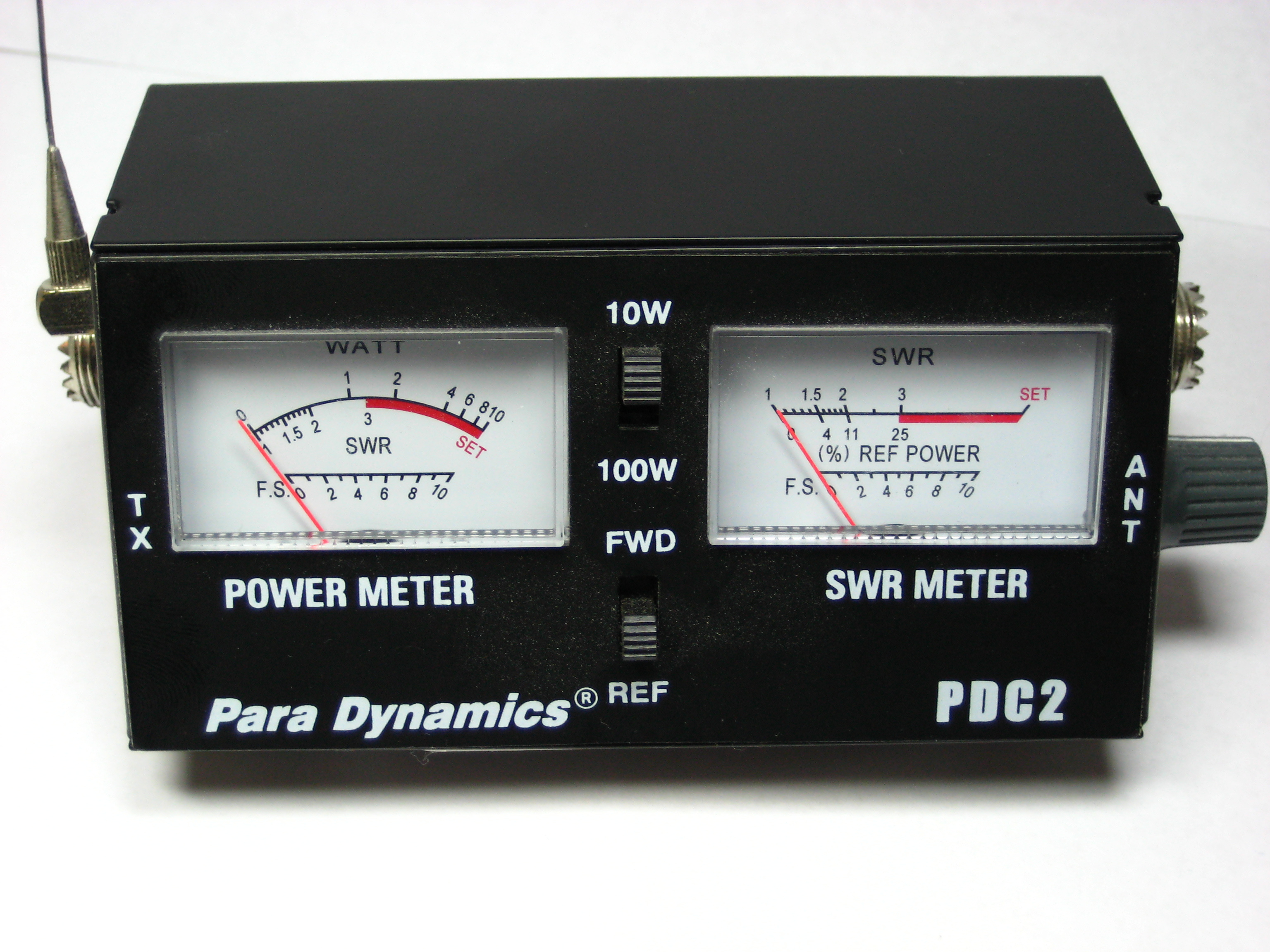
An SWR meter for CB radio equipment

A standing wave ratio meter, SWR meter, ISWR meter (current "I" SWR), or VSWR meter (voltage SWR) measures the standing wave ratio (SWR) in a transmission line. (Note: The terms ISWR (current standing wave ratio) and VSWR (voltage standing wave ratio) are sometimes used to emphasized the method by which the measurement is made, however, in the absence of measurement errors, the two numbers are identical. The circumspect term SWR is preferred to avoid false precision.) The meter indirectly measures the degree of mismatch between a transmission line and its load (usually an antenna). Electronics technicians use it to adjust radio transmitters and their antennas and feedlines to be impedance matched so they work together properly, and evaluate the effectiveness of other impedance matching efforts.

== Directional SWR meter ==
A directional SWR meter measures the magnitude of the forward and reflected waves by sensing each one individually, with directional couplers. A calculation then produces the SWR.

A simple directional SWR meter

Referring to the above diagram, the transmitter (TX) and antenna (ANT) terminals connect via an internal transmission line. This main line is electromagnetically coupled to two smaller sense lines (directional couplers). These are terminated with resistors at one end and diode rectifiers at the other. Some meters use a printed circuit board with three parallel traces to make the transmission line and two sensing lines. The resistors match the characteristic impedance of the sense lines. The diodes convert the magnitudes of the forward and reverse waves to the terminals FWD and REV, respectively, as DC voltages, which are smoothed by the capacitors. The meter or amplifier (not shown) connected to the FWD and REV terminals acts as the required drain resistor, and determines the dwell-time of the meter reading.

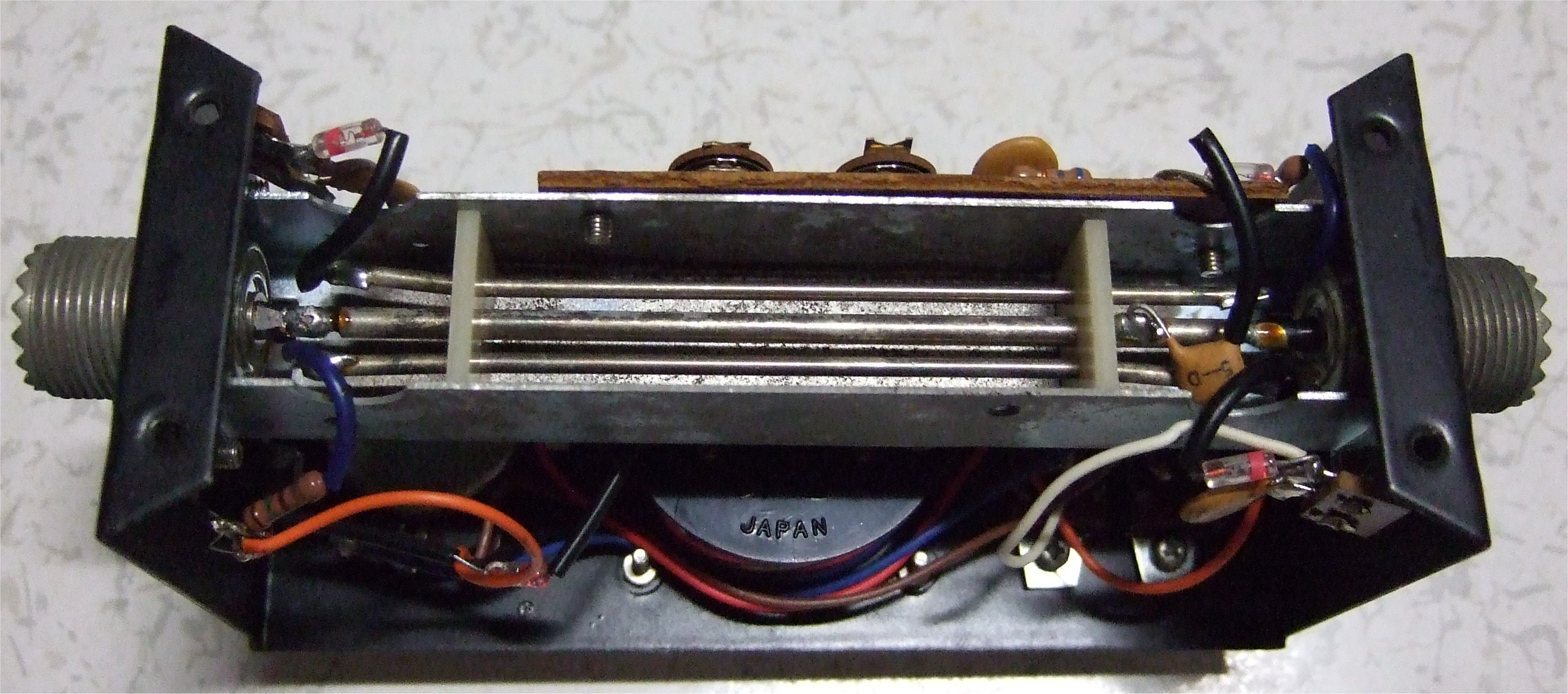
Interior view of an SWR meter. The three parallel coupled lines are visible. Diodes, capacitors and termination resistors are mounted at the ends of the sense lines.

To calculate the SWR, first calculate the reflection coefficient:

$$\Gamma =  \frac{V_{rev}}{\;V_{fwd}\;}$$

(the voltages should include a relative phase factor).

Then calculate the SWR:

$$\mathsf{SWR}  = \frac{1 + |\Gamma|}{1 - |\Gamma|} ~.$$

In a passive meter, this is usually indicated on a non-linear scale.

== Radio operators' SWR meters ==
For decades radio operators have built and used SWR meters as a simple tuning and diagnostic tool. With shielding compromised, a pair of coax or twin line transmission lines, placed close enough, suffer crosstalk. A wave moving in the driven line induces waves in the measurement line. Placed in parallel (straight or loosely coiled) a driven wave reinforces or cancels an induced wave in the same or opposite direction. If the cable pair exceeds half wavelength, cancellation is complete, and power dissipated in matched termination is approximately proportional to the forward and reflected power.

CircuitMod-2.7 simulation of SWR meter with mismatched load Resistors represent meter movements. Reflected graph is voltage on left resistor. Forward graph is voltage on right resistor.

The approximation improves as crosstalk weakens and harmonic number increases. Over time, nonlinear high gain amplifiers have replaced nonlinear electro-mechanical movements – which replaced incandescent bulbs – to require less cross-talk and improve linear frequency range.

Because all frequencies above minimum contribute, the measured ratio is a single frequency quality measure, that increases with unintended harmonics and spurious emissions, as well as actual SWR. By analogy, the measurement cable is a crystal radio (non-discriminating receiver) representing all the radio receivers that might suffer interference from dirty emissions. Though called an SWR Meter, a low measured ratio indicates not only good match, but also clean A3, F3, or G3 emission without excessive harmonics nor spurious (out-of-channel) power.

== SWR bridge ==
SWR can also be measured using an impedance bridge. The bridge is balanced (0 Volts across the detector) only when the test impedance exactly matches the reference impedance. When a transmission line is mismatched (SWR > 1:1), its input impedance deviates from its characteristic impedance; thus, a bridge can be used to determine the presence or absence of a low SWR.

To test for a match, the reference impedance of the bridge is set to the expected load impedance (for example, 50 Ohms), and the transmission line connected as the unknown impedance. RF power is applied to the circuit. The voltage at the line input represents the vector sum of the forward wave, and the wave reflected from the load. If we know the characteristic impedance of the line is 50 Ohms, we know the magnitude and phase of the forward wave. It's the same wave present on the other side of the detector. Subtracting this known wave from the wave at the line input yields the reflected wave. Properly designed, a bridge circuit can not only indicate a match, but the degree of mismatch – making it possible to calculate the SWR. This usually involves alternately connecting the reference wave and the reflected wave to a power meter, and comparing the magnitudes of the resulting deflections.

== Limitations ==
An SWR meter does not measure the actual impedance of a load (the resistance and reactance), but only the mismatch ratio. To measure the actual impedance requires an antenna analyzer or other similar RF measuring device. For accurate readings, the SWR meter itself must also match the line's impedance (typically 50 or 75 Ohms). To accommodate multiple impedances, some SWR meters have switches that select the impedance appropriate for the sense lines.

An SWR meter should connect to the line as close as possible to the antenna: All practical transmission lines have a certain amount of loss, which attenuates the reflected wave as it travels back along the line. Thus, the SWR is highest closest to the load and only improves as the distance from the load increases, creating the false impression of a matched system.
