= Total active reflection coefficient =

The total active reflection coefficient (TARC) within mathematics and physics scattering theory, relates the total incident power to the total outgoing power in an N-port microwave component. The TARC is mainly used for multiple-input multiple-output (MIMO) antenna systems and array antennas, where the outgoing power is unwanted reflected power. The name shows the similarities with the active reflection coefficient, which is used for single elements. The TARC is the square root of the sum of all outgoing powers at the ports, divided by the sum of all incident powers at the ports of an N-port antenna. Similarly to the active reflection coefficient, the TARC is a function of frequency, and it also depends on scan angle and tapering. With this definition we can characterize the multi-port antenna’s frequency bandwidth and radiation performance. When the antennas are made of lossless materials, TARC can be computed directly from the scattering matrix by

$$\Gamma^t_a = \frac{\sqrt{\sum_{i=1}^N |b_i|^2}}{\sqrt{\sum_{i=1}^N |a_i|^2}},$$

where $[b]=[S][a].$ $[S]$ is the antenna's scattering matrix, $[a]$ is the excitation vector, and $[b]$ represents the scattered vector. The TARC is a real number between zero and one, although it is typically presented in decibel scale. When the value of the TARC is equal to zero, all the delivered power is accepted by the antenna and when it is equal to one, all the delivered is coming back as outgoing power (thus the all power is reflected, but not necessarily in the same port).

The normalized total accepted power is given by $(1-|\Gamma^t_a|^2)$. Since antennas in general have radiation efficiency $0 \leq \epsilon \leq 1$, the normalized total radiated power is given by $\epsilon_l = \epsilon (1-|\Gamma^t_a|^2)$. If the directivity of the antenna array is known, the realized gain can therefore be computed by multiplication by $\epsilon_l$. As with all reflection coefficients, a small reflection coefficient does not guarantee a high radiation efficiency since the small reflected signal could also be due to losses.

== See also ==
- Active reflection coefficient
- Antenna (radio)
- Antenna array
