= Coaxial (disambiguation) =

Coaxial, co-axial, co-ax or coax describes a physical arrangement wherein two or more structures share a common axis.

Coaxial may also refer to:

== Electronics ==
- Coaxial cable or simply "coax," a shielded electrical cable widely used for transmission of radio-frequency signals and in computer networking cables
- Coaxial antenna, a half-wave dipole antenna configuration
- Coaxial loudspeaker, a 2-way loudspeaker with the high and low drivers sharing the same axis

=== Connectors ===
- Coaxial connector, any one of various common types of RF connector
- Coaxial power connector, low-current connectors commonly used on consumer electronics

== Other uses ==
- Coaxial escapement, a clock mechanism
- Coaxial mount, a weapon mount placing two or more weapons in parallel
- Coaxial rotors, a contra-rotating twin-rotor configuration for helicopters

== See also ==
- Coaxil, a drug used to treat depression
