= Sloper =

Sloper may refer to

- Ally Sloper, early comic strip character
- BSA Sloper, British motorcycle
- Lindsay Sloper (1826–1887), English pianist
- Robert Sloper (1729–1802), British general
- Sloper antenna, a type of radio antenna
- Sloper pattern, see pattern (sewing)
- A type of climbing hold, see Glossary of climbing terms
