= Dipole antenna =

Antenna consisting of two rod-shaped conductors

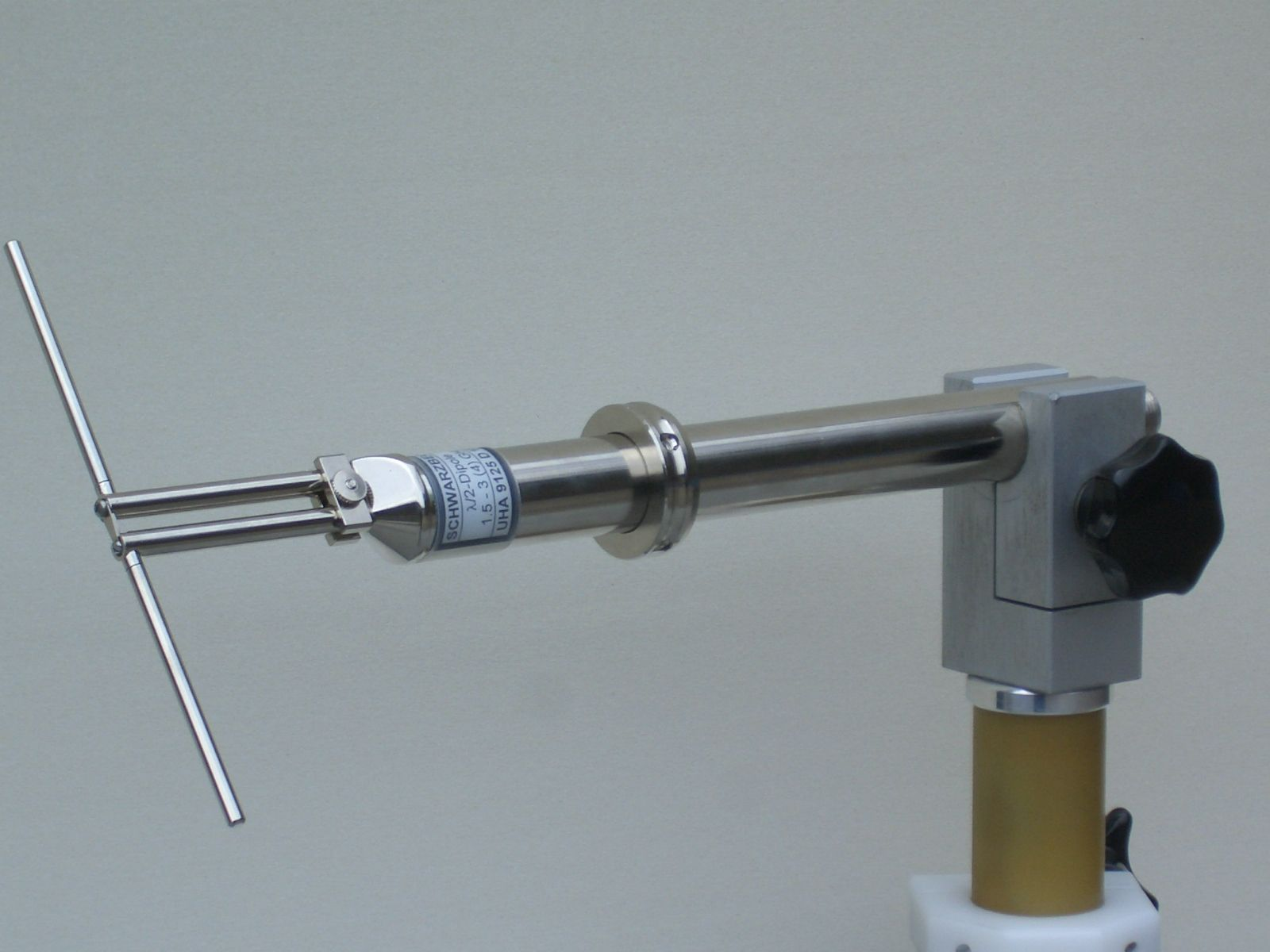
UHF half-wave dipole

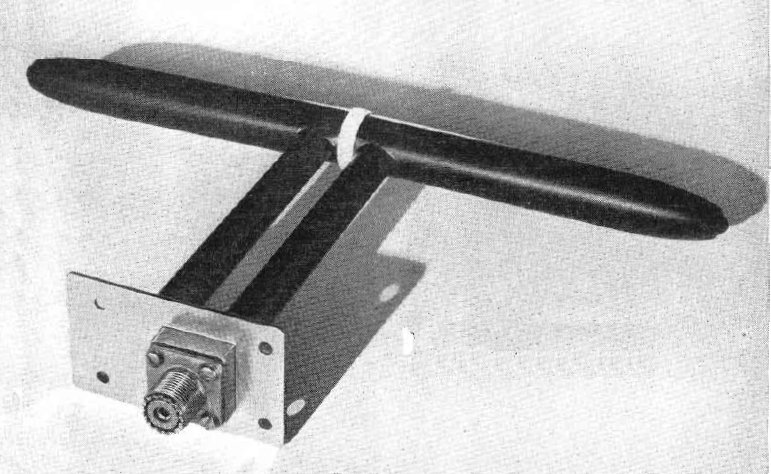
Dipole antenna used by the radar altimeter in an airplane

Animated diagram of a half-wave dipole antenna receiving a radio wave. The antenna consists of two metal rods connected to a receiver R. The electric field (E, green arrows) of the incoming wave pushes the electrons in the rods back and forth, charging the ends alternately positive (+) and negative (−). Since the length of the antenna is one half the wavelength of the wave, the oscillating field induces standing waves of voltage (V, represented by the red band) and current in the rods. The oscillating currents (black arrows) flow down the transmission line and through the receiver (represented by the resistance R).

In radio and telecommunications, a dipole antenna or doublet is one of the two simplest and most widely used types of antenna; the other is the monopole. The dipole is any one of a class of antennas producing a radiation pattern approximating that of an elementary electric dipole with a radiating structure supporting a line current so energized that the current has only one node at each far end. (Note: Dipole antenna: Any one of a class of antennas producing a radiation pattern approximating that of an elementary electric dipole. Syn: doublet antenna.) A dipole antenna commonly consists of two identical conductive elements such as metal wires or rods. The driving current from the transmitter is applied, or for receiving antennas the output signal to the receiver is taken, between the two halves of the antenna. Each side of the feedline to the transmitter or receiver is connected to one of the conductors. This contrasts with a monopole antenna, which consists of a single rod or conductor with one side of the feedline connected to it, and the other side connected to some type of ground. A common example of a dipole is the rabbit ears television antenna found on broadcast television sets. All dipoles are electrically equivalent to two monopoles mounted end-to-end and fed with opposite phases, with the ground plane between them made virtual by the opposing monopole.

The dipole is the simplest type of antenna from a theoretical point of view. Most commonly it consists of two conductors of equal length oriented end-to-end with the feedline connected between them. Dipoles are frequently used as resonant antennas. If the feedpoint of such an antenna is shorted, then it will be able to resonate at a particular frequency, just like a guitar string that is plucked. Using the antenna at around that frequency is advantageous in terms of feedpoint impedance (and thus standing wave ratio), so its length is determined by the intended wavelength (or frequency) of operation. The most commonly used is the center-fed half-wave dipole which is just under a half-wavelength long. The radiation pattern of the half-wave dipole is maximum perpendicular to the conductor, falling to zero in the axial direction, thus implementing an omnidirectional antenna if installed vertically, or (more commonly) a weakly directional antenna if horizontal.

Although they may be used as standalone low-gain antennas, dipoles are also employed as driven elements in more complex antenna designs such as the Yagi antenna and driven arrays. Dipole antennas (or such designs derived from them, including the monopole) are used to feed more elaborate directional antennas such as a horn antenna, parabolic reflector, or corner reflector. Engineers analyze vertical (or other monopole) antennas on the basis of dipole antennas of which they are one half.

== History ==
German physicist Heinrich Hertz first demonstrated the existence of radio waves in 1887 using what we now know as a dipole antenna (with capacitative end-loading). On the other hand, Guglielmo Marconi empirically found that he could just ground the transmitter (or one side of a transmission line, if used) dispensing with one half of the antenna, thus realizing the vertical or monopole antenna. For the low frequencies Marconi employed to achieve long-distance communications, this form was more practical; when radio moved to higher frequencies (especially VHF transmissions for FM radio and TV) it was advantageous for these much smaller antennas to be entirely atop a tower thus requiring a dipole antenna or one of its variations.

In the early days of radio, the thus-named Marconi antenna (monopole) and the doublet (dipole) were seen as distinct inventions. Now, however, the monopole antenna is understood as a special case of a dipole which has a virtual element underground.

== Dipole variations ==
=== Short dipole ===
A short dipole is a dipole formed by two conductors with a total length ℓ substantially less than a half wavelength ( 1/ 2 λ ). Short dipoles are sometimes used in applications where a full half-wave dipole would be too large. They can be analyzed easily using the results obtained below for the Hertzian dipole, a fictitious entity. Being shorter than a resonant antenna (half a wavelength long) its feedpoint impedance includes a large capacitive reactance requiring a loading coil or other matching network in order to be practical, especially as a transmitting antenna.

To find the far-field electric and magnetic fields generated by a short dipole we use the result shown below for the Hertzian dipole (an infinitesimal current element) at a distance r from the current and at an angle θ to the direction of the current, as being:

$$\begin{align}
H_\mathrm{\phi} \quad &= \quad  j\ \frac{\ I_\mathrm{h}\ \ell\ k\ }{4\pi\ r}\ e^{\ j\ \left( \omega t\ -\ k r \right)}\ \sin(\ \theta\ ) \\
E_\mathrm{\theta} \quad &= \quad  \zeta_\mathrm{o}\ H_\mathrm{\phi} \quad = \quad j\ \frac{\ \zeta_\mathrm{o}\ I_\mathrm{h}\ \ell\ k\ }{4\pi\ r}\ e^{\ j\ \left( \omega t\ -\ k r \right)}\ \sin(\ \theta\ ) ~.
\end{align}$$

where the radiator consists of a current of $\ I_\mathrm{h}\ e^{\ j \omega t}\$ over a short length ℓ and $\ j^2 \equiv -1\$ in electronics replaces the customary mathematical symbol i for the square root of −1. ω is the angular (radian) frequency ($\omega \equiv 2 \pi f\$) and k is the wavenumber ($\ k \equiv 2\pi / \lambda\$). ζ_{0} is the impedance of free space ($\ \zeta_\mathrm{o} \approx 376.7\ \mathsf{\Omega}\$), which is the ratio of a free space plane wave's electric to magnetic field strength.

Diagram of a short dipole antenna

The feedpoint is usually at the center of the dipole as shown in the diagram. The current along dipole arms are approximately described as proportional to $\ \sin(\ k\ z\ )\$ where z is the distance to the nearest end of the arm. In the case of a short dipole, that is essentially a linear drop from $\ I_\mathrm{o}\$ at the feedpoint to zero at the end. Therefore, this is comparable to a Hertzian dipole with an effective current I_{h} equal to the average current over the conductor, so $\ I_\mathrm{h} = \tfrac{\ 1\ }{ 2 }\ I_\mathrm{o} ~.$ With that substitution, the above equations closely approximate the fields generated by a short dipole fed by current $\ I_\mathrm{o} ~.$

From the fields calculated above, one can find the radiated flux (power per unit area) at any point as the magnitude of the real part of the Poynting vector, S, which is given by $\ \tfrac{\ 1\ }{ 2 } \mathbf{E} \times \mathbf{H}^* ~.$ Because E and H are at right angles and in phase, there is no imaginary part and the cross product is equal to $\ \tfrac{\ 1\ }{ 2 }\ E_\mathrm{\theta}\ H_\mathrm{\phi}^*\ ;$ the phase factors (the exponentials) cancel out, leaving:

$$\begin{align}
S &= \frac{\ 1\ }{ 2 }\ E_\mathrm{\theta}\ H_\mathrm{\phi}^*
&= \frac{\ 1\ }{ 2 }\ \frac{\ \zeta_\mathrm{o}\ I_\mathrm{h}^2\ \ell^2\ k^2\ }{(4\pi r)^2}\ \sin^2\!(\ \theta\ )
&= \frac{\ \zeta_\mathrm{o}\ }{ 32 }\ I_\mathrm{o}^2\ \left(\frac{\ \ell\ }{\lambda}\right)^2\ \frac{ 1 }{\ r^2 }\ \sin^2\!(\ \theta\ ) ~.
\end{align}$$

We have now expressed the flux in terms of the feedpoint current I_{o} and the ratio of the short dipole's length ℓ to the wavelength of radiation λ. The radiation pattern given by $\ \sin^2\!(\ \theta\ )\$ is seen to be similar to and only slightly less directional than that of the half-wave dipole.

Radiation pattern of the short dipole (dashed line) compared to the half-wave dipole (solid line)

Using the above expression for the radiation in the far field for a given feedpoint current, we can integrate over all solid angle to obtain the total radiated power.

$$P_\text{total} = \frac{\ \pi\ }{ 12 }\ \zeta_\mathrm{o}\ I_\mathrm{o}^2\ \left( \frac{\ell}{\lambda} \right)^2 ~.$$

From that, it is possible to infer the radiation resistance, equal to the resistive (real) part of the feedpoint impedance, neglecting a component due to ohmic losses (presumed smaller). By setting P_{total} to the power supplied at the feedpoint $\ \tfrac{\ 1\ }{ 2 }\ I_\mathrm{o}^2\ R_\mathrm{radiation}\$ we find:

$$\ R_\mathrm{radiation} = \frac{\ \pi\ }{6}\ \zeta_\mathrm{o}\ \left(\frac{\ell}{\lambda}\right)^2 \approx \left(\frac{\ell}{\lambda}\right)^2 (197\ \Omega) ~.$$

Again, these approximations become quite accurate for ℓ ≪ 1/ 2 λ . Setting ℓ = 1/ 2 λ despite its use not quite being valid for so large a fraction of the wavelength, the formula would predict a radiation resistance of 49 Ω, instead of the actual value of 73 Ω produced by a half-wave dipole, when more correct quarter-wave sinusoidal currents are used.

=== Dipole antennas of various lengths ===
The fundamental resonance of a thin linear conductor occurs at a frequency whose free-space wavelength is twice the wire's length; i.e. where the conductor is 1/2 wavelength long. Dipole antennas are frequently used at around that frequency and thus termed half-wave dipole antennas. This important case is dealt with in the next section.

Thin linear conductors of length $\ \ell\$ are in fact resonant at any integer multiple of a half-wavelength:

$$\ \ell = n \times \frac{\ \lambda\ }{2}\$$

where n is an integer, $\ \lambda = \frac{\ c\ }{ f }\$ is the wavelength, and c is the reduced speed of radio waves in the radiating conductor (c ≈ 97%×c_{o}, the speed of light). For a center-fed dipole, however, there is a great dissimilarity between n being odd or being even. Dipoles which are an odd number of half-wavelengths in length have reasonably low driving point impedances (which are purely resistive at that resonant frequency). However ones which are an even number of half-wavelengths in length, that is, an integer number of wavelengths in length, have a high driving point impedance (albeit purely resistive at that resonant frequency).

For instance, a full-wave dipole antenna can be made with two half-wavelength conductors placed end to end for a total length of approximately $\ \ell \approx \lambda\ .$ This results in an additional gain over a half-wave dipole of about 2 dB. Full wave dipoles can be used in short wave broadcasting only by making the effective diameter very large and feeding from a high impedance balanced line. Cage dipoles are often used to get the large diameter.

A 5/4-wave dipole antenna has a much lower but not purely resistive feedpoint impedance, which requires a matching network to the impedance of the transmission line. Its gain is about 3 dB greater than a half-wave dipole, the highest gain of any dipole of any similar length.

Gain of dipole antennas
Length, $\ \ell\$ in wavelengths	Directive gain (dBi)	Notes
≪ 0.5	1.76	Poor efficiency
0.5	2.15	Most common
1.0	4.0	Only with fat dipoles
1.25	5.2	Greatest gain
1.5	3.5	Third harmonic
2.0	4.3	Not used

Other reasonable lengths of dipole do not offer advantages and are seldom used. However the overtone resonances of a half-wave dipole antenna at odd multiples of its fundamental frequency are sometimes exploited. For instance, amateur radio antennas designed as half-wave dipoles at 7 MHz can also be used as 3/2-wave dipoles at 21 MHz; likewise VHF television antennas resonant at the low VHF television band (centered around 65 MHz) are also resonant at the high VHF television band (around 195 MHz).

=== Half-wave dipole ===
Animation of a transmitting half-wave dipole showing the voltage $\ V(x)\$ (red, ) and current $\ I(x)\$ (blue, ) due to the standing wave on the antenna. Since the standing wave is mainly storing energy, not transporting power, the current is not in phase with the voltage but 90° out of phase. The transmission line applies an oscillating voltage $\ V_\text{i}\cos \omega t\$ from the transmitter between the two antenna elements, driving the sinusoidal oscillation. The feed voltage step has been increased for visibility; typical dipoles have a high enough Q factor that the feed voltage is much smaller in relation to the standing wave. Since the antenna is fed at its resonant frequency, the input voltage is in phase with the current (blue bar), so the antenna presents a pure resistance to the feedline. The energy from the driving current provides the energy radiated as radio waves. In a receiving antenna the phase of the voltage at the transmission line would be reversed, since the receiver absorbs energy from the antenna.

A half-wave dipole antenna consists of two quarter-wavelength conductors placed end to end for a total length of approximately ℓ = 1/2 λ . The current distribution is that of a standing wave, approximately sinusoidal along the length of the dipole, with a node at each end and an antinode (peak current) at the center (feedpoint):

$$I(z) = I_0 \cos(\omega t) \cos(k z)\ ,$$

where k = 2π/λ and z runs from − 1/2ℓ to + 1/2ℓ.

In the far field, this produces a radiation pattern whose electric field is given by

$$\ E_\theta = \frac{\ \zeta_0 I_0\ }{2\pi r}\ \frac{\ \cos\left(\frac{\pi}{2}\ \cos\theta\right)\ }{\sin\theta}\ \sin{(\omega t - kr)} ~.$$

The directional factor $\ \frac{ \cos\left[\ \tfrac{\pi}{2}\ \cos\theta\ \right] }{ \sin\theta }\$ is very nearly the same as sin θ applying to the short dipole, resulting in a very similar radiation pattern as noted above.

A numerical integration of the radiated power $\ \frac{\ |E_\theta|^2\ }{2\zeta_0}\$ over all solid angle, as we did for the short dipole, obtains a value for the total power P_{total} radiated by the dipole with a current having a peak value of I_{0} as in the form specified above. Dividing P_{total} by $4 \pi r^2$ supplies the flux at a large distance, averaged over all directions. Dividing the flux in the θ = π/2 direction (where it is at its peak) at that large distance by the average flux, we find the directive gain to be 1.64 . This can also be directly computed using the cosine integral:

$G = \frac{4}{\ \operatorname{Cin}(2\pi)\ } \approx 1.64 ~$ (2.15 dBi)

( The Cin(x) form of the cosine integral is not the same as the Ci(x) form; they differ by a logarithm. Both MATLAB and Mathematica have inbuilt functions which compute Ci(x), but not Cin(x). See the Wikipedia page on cosine integral for the relationship between these functions. )

We can now also find the radiation resistance as we did for the short dipole by solving:

$$P_\mathsf{total} = \frac{1}{2} I_0^2 R_\mathsf{radiation}\$$

to obtain:

$$R_\mathsf{radiation} \approx 73.1\ \mathsf\Omega ~.$$

Using the induced EMF method, the real part of the driving point impedance can also be written in terms of the cosine integral, obtaining the same result:

$$R_\mathsf{radiation} = \frac{\zeta_0}{\ 4\pi\ } \operatorname{Cin}(2\pi) = \frac{\zeta_0}{\ 4\pi\ } \int_0^{2\pi} \frac{\ 1 - \cos \theta\ }{\theta}\ \mathrm{d}\theta\ \approx\ 73.1\ \mathsf\Omega ~.$$

If a half-wave dipole is driven at a point other the center, then the feed point resistance will be higher. The radiation resistance is usually expressed relative to the maximum current present along an antenna element, which for the half-wave dipole (and most other antennas) is also the current at the feedpoint. However, if the dipole is fed at a different point at a distance x from a current maximum (the center in the case of a half-wave dipole), then the current there is not I_{0} but only I_{0} cos( k x ) .

In order to supply the same power, the voltage at the feedpoint has to be similarly increased by the factor sec( k x ) . Consequently, the resistive part of the feedpoint impedance $\ \operatorname\mathcal{R_e}\left[ \tfrac{V}{\ I\ } \right]\$ is increased by the factor sec^{2}( k x ) :

$$\ R_\mathsf{feedpoint} = \frac{\ R_\mathsf{radiation}\ }{\cos^2(k x)} \approx \frac{ 73.1\ \mathsf\Omega }{\ \cos^2(k x)\ }\$$

This equation can also be used for dipole antennas of any length, provided that R_{radiation} has been computed relative to the current maximum, which is not generally the same as the feedpoint current for dipoles longer than half-wave. Note that this equation breaks down when feeding an antenna near a current node, where cos( k x ) approaches zero. The driving point impedance does indeed rise greatly, but is nevertheless limited due to higher order components of the elements' not-quite-exactly-sinusoidal current, which have been ignored above in the model for the current distribution.

=== Folded dipole ===
A folded dipole is a half-wave dipole with an additional parallel wire connecting its two ends. If the additional wire has the same diameter and cross-section as the dipole, two nearly identical radiating currents are generated. The resulting far-field emission pattern is nearly identical to the one for the single-wire dipole described above, but at resonance its feedpoint impedance $\ R_\mathsf{f.d.}\$ is four times the feedpoint impedance of a single-wire dipole.

A folded dipole is, technically, a folded full-wave loop antenna, where the loop has been bent at opposing ends and squashed into two parallel wires in a flat line. Although the broad bandwidth, high feedpoint impedance, and high efficiency are characteristics more similar to a full loop antenna, the folded dipole's radiation pattern is more like an ordinary dipole. Since the operation of a single halfwave dipole is easier to understand, both full loops and folded dipoles are often described as two halfwave dipoles in parallel, connected at the ends.

The high feedpoint impedance $\ R_\mathsf{f.d.}\$ at resonance is because for a fixed amount of power, the total radiating current $\ I_0\$ is equal to twice the current in each wire separately and thus equal to twice the current at the feed point. We equate the average radiated power to the average power delivered at the feedpoint, we may write

$$\ \frac{\ 1\ }{ 2 }\ R_\mathsf{h.w.}\ I_0^2 = \frac{1}{2}\ R_\mathsf{f.d.}\ \left( \frac{\ 1\ }{ 2 }\ I_0 \right)^2\ ,$$

where $\ R_\mathsf{h.w.}\$ is the lower feedpoint impedance of the resonant halfwave dipole. It follows that

$$\ R_\mathsf{f.d.} = 4 R_\mathsf{h.w.} \approx 292\ \mathsf{\Omega} ~.$$

Half-wave folded dipoles are often used for FM radio antennas; versions made with twin lead which can be hung on an inside wall often come with FM tuners. They are also widely used as driven elements for rooftop Yagi television antennas. The T²FD antenna is a folded dipole with a resistor added on the second wire, opposite the feedpoint.

The folded dipole is therefore well matched to 300 Ω balanced transmission lines, such as twin-feed ribbon cable. The folded dipole has a wider bandwidth than a single dipole. They can be used for transforming the value of input impedance of the dipole over a broad range of step-up ratios by changing the thicknesses of the wire conductors for the fed- and folded-sides.

Instead of altering thickness or spacing, one can add a third parallel wire to increase the feedpoint impedance to 9 times that of a single-wire dipole, raising the impedance to 658 Ω, making a good match for open wire feed cable, and further broadening the resonant frequency band of the antenna. More extra parallel wires can be added: Any number of extra parallel wires can be joined onto the antenna, with the feedpoint impedance given by

$$\ R_\mathsf{rad} \approx  n^2\ \times\ 73\mathsf{\ \Omega\ ,}$$

where $\ n\$ is the number of parallel halfwave-long wires laid side-by-side in the antenna, and connected at their ends. It is also possible to modify the so-called flattened-loop design, and get nearly as good performance, by making each of the parallel wires too short by the same amount, but connecting a single capacitive loading wire (going off in nearly any direction, most often dangling) on each of the antenna ends. The loading wire length is equal to the single missing length of one of the parallel wires.

=== Other variants ===
There are numerous modifications to the shape of a dipole antenna which are useful in one way or another but result in similar radiation characteristics (low gain). This is not to mention the many directional antennas which include one or more dipole elements in their design as driven elements, many of which are linked to in the information box at the bottom of this page.

- The bow-tie antenna is a dipole with flaring, triangular shaped arms. The shape gives it a much wider bandwidth than an ordinary dipole. It is widely used in UHF television antennas.

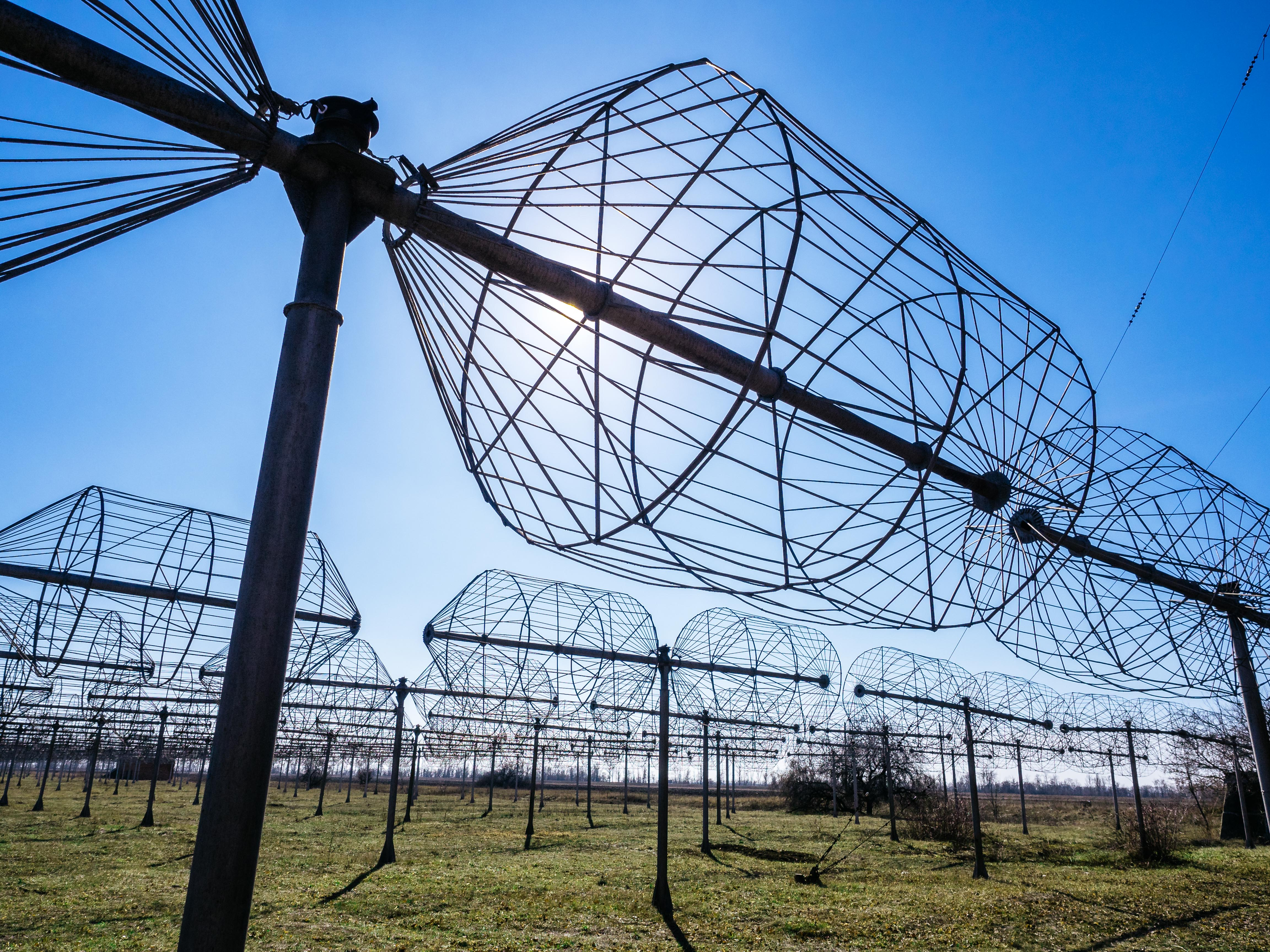
Cage dipole antennas in the Ukrainian UTR-2 radio telescope. The 8 meters (30 feet) long by 1.8 meters (6 feet) diameter galvanized steel wire dipoles have an operating frequency range of 8–33 MHz.

- The cage dipole is a similar modification in which the bandwidth is increased by using fat cylindrical dipole elements made of a cage of wires (see photo). These are used in a few broadband array antennas in the medium wave and shortwave bands for applications such as over-the-horizon radar and radio telescopes.
- A halo antenna is a half-wave dipole bent into a circle for a nearly uniform radiation pattern in the plane of the circle. When the halo's circle is horizontal, it produces horizontally polarized radiation in a nearly omnidirectional pattern with only a little power wasted toward the zenith, compared to a straight horizontal dipole. In practice, it is categorized either as a bent dipole or as a loop antenna, depending on author preference. (Note: A halo antenna has a break opposite its feedpoint, so no DC connection between the two ends. Some see this as a crucial distinction between halos and other loop antennas. However, for RF current, because the high-voltage ends are bent close together the end capacitance connects the ends electrically through displacement current, essentially the same as the tuning capacitor on a small loop. Since a halo antenna is already resonant, a large capacitance is not needed, but since capacitance is present, the halo arms must be trimmed back to compensate. The halo ends are often cut even shorter than needed, and moved closer together to compensate, since the resulting more uniform current improves the halo's omnidirectional pattern and further reduces radiation out of the plane of the halo's loop.)
- A turnstile antenna comprises two dipoles crossed at a right angle and feed system which introduces a quarter-wave phase difference between the currents along the two. With that geometry, the two dipoles do not interact electrically but their fields add in the far-field producing a net radiation pattern that is rather close to isotropic, with horizontal polarization in the plane of the elements and circular or elliptical polarization at other angles. Turnstile antennas can be stacked and fed in phase to realize an omnidirectional broadside array or phased for an end-fire array with circular polarization.
- The batwing antenna is a turnstile antenna with its linear elements widened as in a bow-tie antenna, again for the purpose of widening its resonant frequency and thus usable over a larger bandwidth, without re-tuning. When stacked to form an array the radiation is omnidirectional, horizontally polarized, and with increased gain at low elevations, making it ideal for television broadcasting.
- A V antenna is a dipole with a bend in the middle so its arms are at an angle instead of co-linear.
- A quadrant antenna is a 'V' antenna with an unusual overall length of a full wavelength, with two half-wave horizontal elements meeting at a right angle where it is fed. Quadrant antennas produce mostly horizontal polarization at low to intermediate elevation angles and have nearly omnidirectional radiation patterns.

One implementation uses cage elements (see above); the thickness of the resulting elements lowers the high driving point impedance of a full-wave dipole to a value that accommodates a reasonable match to open wire lines and increases the bandwidth (in terms of SWR) to a full octave. They are used for HF band transmissions.

- The G5RV antenna is a dipole antenna fed indirectly, through a carefully chosen length of 300 Ω or 450 Ω twin lead, which acts as an impedance matching network to connect (through a balun) to a standard 50 Ω coaxial transmission line.
- The sloper antenna is a slanted vertical dipole antenna attached to the top of a single tower. The element can be center-fed or can be end-fed as an unbalanced monopole antenna from a transmission line at the top of the tower, in which case the monopole's ground connection can better be viewed as a second element comprising the tower or transmission line shield.
- The inverted 'V' antenna is likewise supported using a single tower but is a balanced antenna with two symmetric elements angled toward the ground. It is thus a half-wave dipole with a bend in the middle. Like the sloper, this has the practical advantage of elevating the antenna but requiring only a single tower.
- The AS-2259 antenna is an inverted-‘V’ dipole antenna used for local communications via Near Vertical Incidence Skywave (NVIS).

=== Vertical (monopole) antennas ===
A 1/4 λ monopole antenna and its ground image together form a 1/2 λ dipole that radiates only in the upper half of space.

The vertical, Marconi, or monopole antenna is a single-element antenna usually fed at the bottom (with the shield side of its unbalanced transmission line connected to ground). It behaves essentially the same as half of a dipole antenna. The ground (or ground plane) is considered to be a conductive surface that works as a reflector (see effect of ground). Vertical currents in the reflected image have the same direction (thus are not reflected about the ground) and phase as the current in the real antenna. The conductor and its image together act as a dipole in the upper half of space. Like a dipole, in order to achieve resonance (resistive feedpoint impedance) the conductor must be close to a quarter wavelength in height (like each conductor in a half-wave dipole).

In this upper side of space, the emitted field has the same amplitude of the field radiated by a similar dipole fed with the same current. Therefore, the total emitted power is half the emitted power of a dipole fed with the same current. As the current is the same, the radiation resistance (real part of series impedance) will be half of the series impedance of the comparable dipole. A quarter-wave monopole, then, has an impedance of $\ \frac{\ 73\ +\ j\ 43\ }{2} = 36\ +\ j\ 21\ \mathsf{\Omega} ~.$ Another way of seeing this is that a true dipole receiving a current I has voltages on its terminals of +V and −V, for an impedance across the terminals of 2 V/ I , whereas the comparable vertical antenna has the current I but an applied voltage of only V.

Since the fields above ground are the same as for the dipole, but only half the power is applied, the gain is doubled to 5.14 dBi . This is not an actual performance advantage per se, since in practice a dipole also reflects half of its power off the ground which (depending on the antenna height and sky angle) can augment (or cancel!) the direct signal. The vertical polarization of the monopole (as for a vertically oriented dipole) is advantageous at low elevation angles where the ground reflection combines with the direct wave approximately in phase.

The earth acts as a ground plane, but it can be a poor conductor leading to losses. Its conductivity can be improved (at cost) by laying a copper mesh. When an actual ground is not available (such as in a vehicle) other metallic surfaces can serve as a ground plane (typically the vehicle's roof). Alternatively, radial wires placed at the base of the antenna can form a ground plane. For VHF and UHF bands, the radiating and ground plane elements can be constructed from rigid rods or tubes. Using such an artificial ground plane allows for the entire antenna and ground to be mounted at an arbitrary height. One common modification has the radials forming the ground plane sloped down, which has the effect of raising the feedpoint impedance to around 50 Ω, matching common coaxial cable. No longer being a true ground, a balun (such as a simple choke balun) is then recommended.

== Dipole characteristics ==
=== Impedance of dipoles of various lengths ===
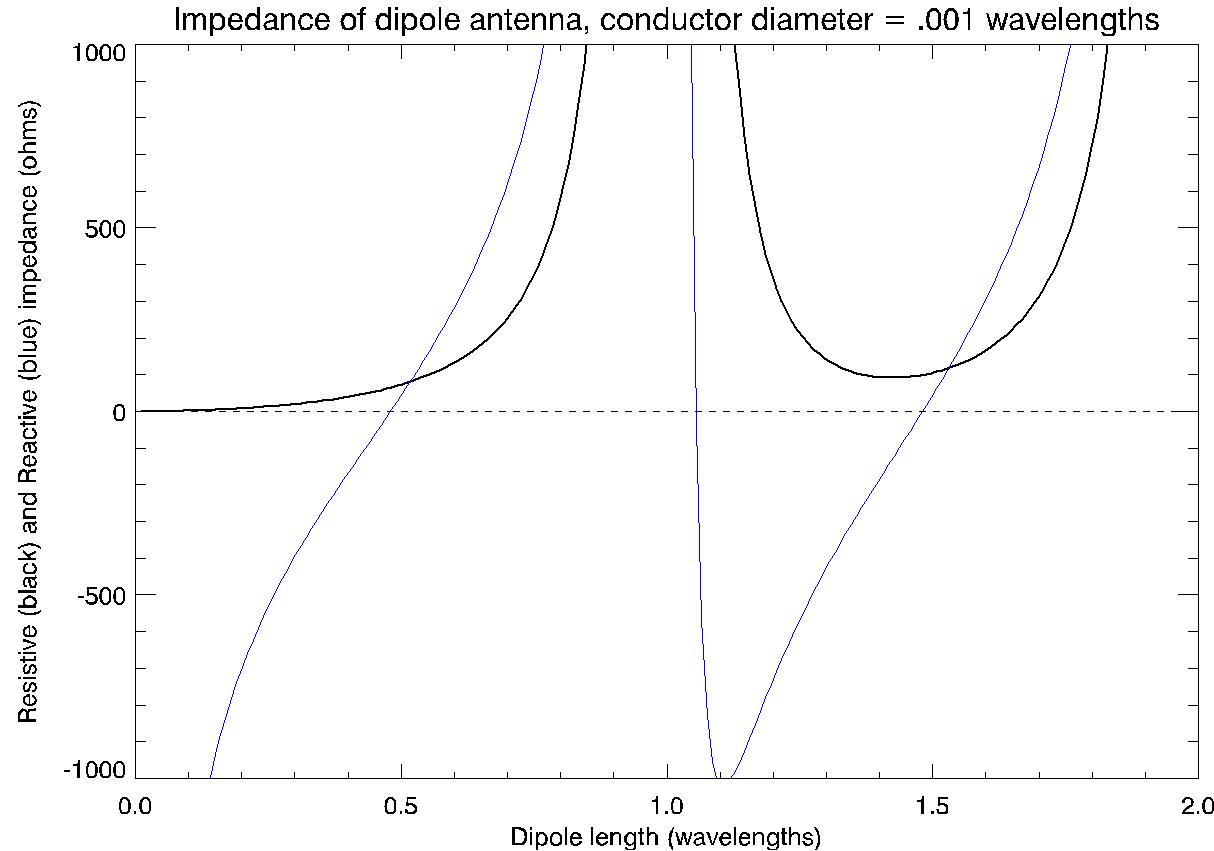
Resistive (black) and reactive (blue) parts of the dipole feedpoint impedance versus total length in wavelengths, assuming a conductor diameter of 0.001 wavelengths

The feedpoint impedance of a dipole antenna is sensitive to its electrical length and feedpoint position. Therefore, a dipole will generally only perform optimally over a rather narrow bandwidth, beyond which its impedance will become a poor match for the transmitter or receiver (and transmission line). The real (resistive) and imaginary (reactive) components of that impedance, as a function of electrical length, are shown in the accompanying graph. The detailed calculation of these numbers are described below. Note that the value of the reactance is highly dependent on the diameter of the conductors; this plot is for conductors with a diameter of 0.001 wavelengths.

Dipoles that are much smaller than one half the wavelength of the signal are called short dipoles. These have a very low radiation resistance (and a high capacitive reactance) making them inefficient antennas. More of a transmitter's current is dissipated as heat due to the finite resistance of the conductors which is greater than the radiation resistance. However they can nevertheless be practical receiving antennas for longer wavelengths. (Note: Below 20 MHz, atmospheric noise is high; consequently, received power levels must be significantly above the thermal noise floor. The receiving antenna's inefficiency is masked by the higher power level.)

Dipoles whose length is approximately half the wavelength of the signal are called half-wave dipoles and are widely used as such or as the basis for derivative antenna designs. These have a radiation resistance which is much greater, closer to the characteristic impedances of available transmission lines, and normally much larger than the resistance of the conductors, so that their efficiency approaches 100%. In general radio engineering, the term dipole, if not further qualified, is taken to mean a center-fed half-wave dipole.

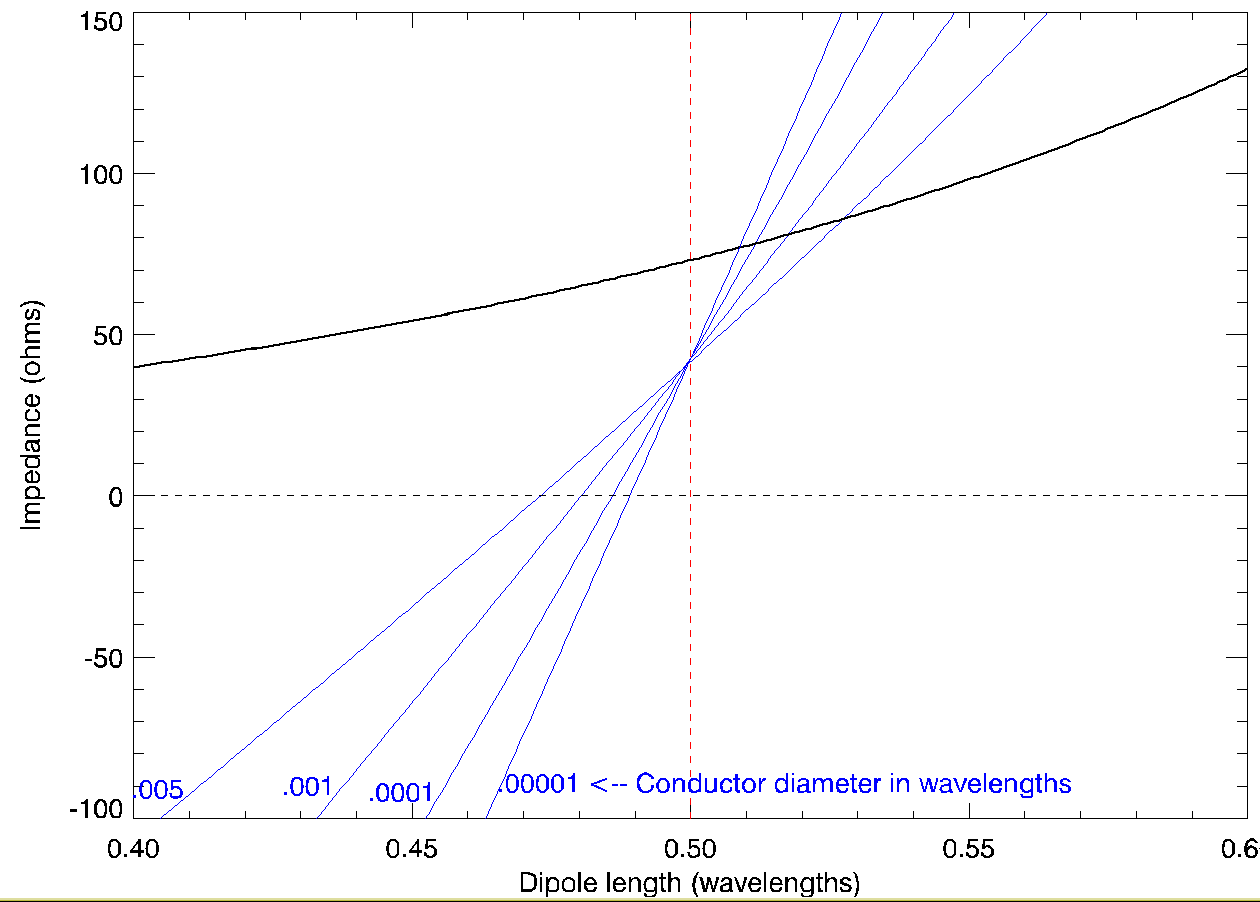
Feedpoint impedance of (near-) half-wave dipoles versus electrical length in wavelengths. Black: radiation resistance; blue: reactance for four different values of conductor diameter.

A true half-wave dipole is one half of the wavelength λ in length, where λ = c/ f in free space. Such a dipole has a feedpoint impedance consisting of 73 Ω resistance and +43 Ω reactance, thus presenting a slightly inductive reactance. To cancel that reactance, and present a pure resistance to the feedline, the element is shortened by the factor k for a net length $\ \ell\$ of:

$$\ \ell = \frac{\ 1\ }{ 2 }\ k\ \lambda = \frac{\ 1\ }{ 2 }\ k\ \frac{\ c\ }{ f }\$$

where λ is the free-space wavelength, c is the speed of light in free space, and f is the frequency. The adjustment factor k which causes feedpoint reactance to be eliminated, depends on the diameter of the conductor, as is plotted in the accompanying graph. The relative scale-size k ranges from about 0.98 for thin wires (diameter, 0.00001 wave) to about 0.94 for thick conductors (diameter, 0.008 wave). This is because the effect of antenna length on reactance (upper graph) is much greater for thinner conductors so that a smaller deviation from the exact half wavelength is required in order to cancel the 43 Ω inductive reactance it has when exactly 1/ 2 λ . For the same reason, antennas with thicker conductors have a wider operating bandwidth over which they attain a practical standing wave ratio which is degraded by any remaining reactance.

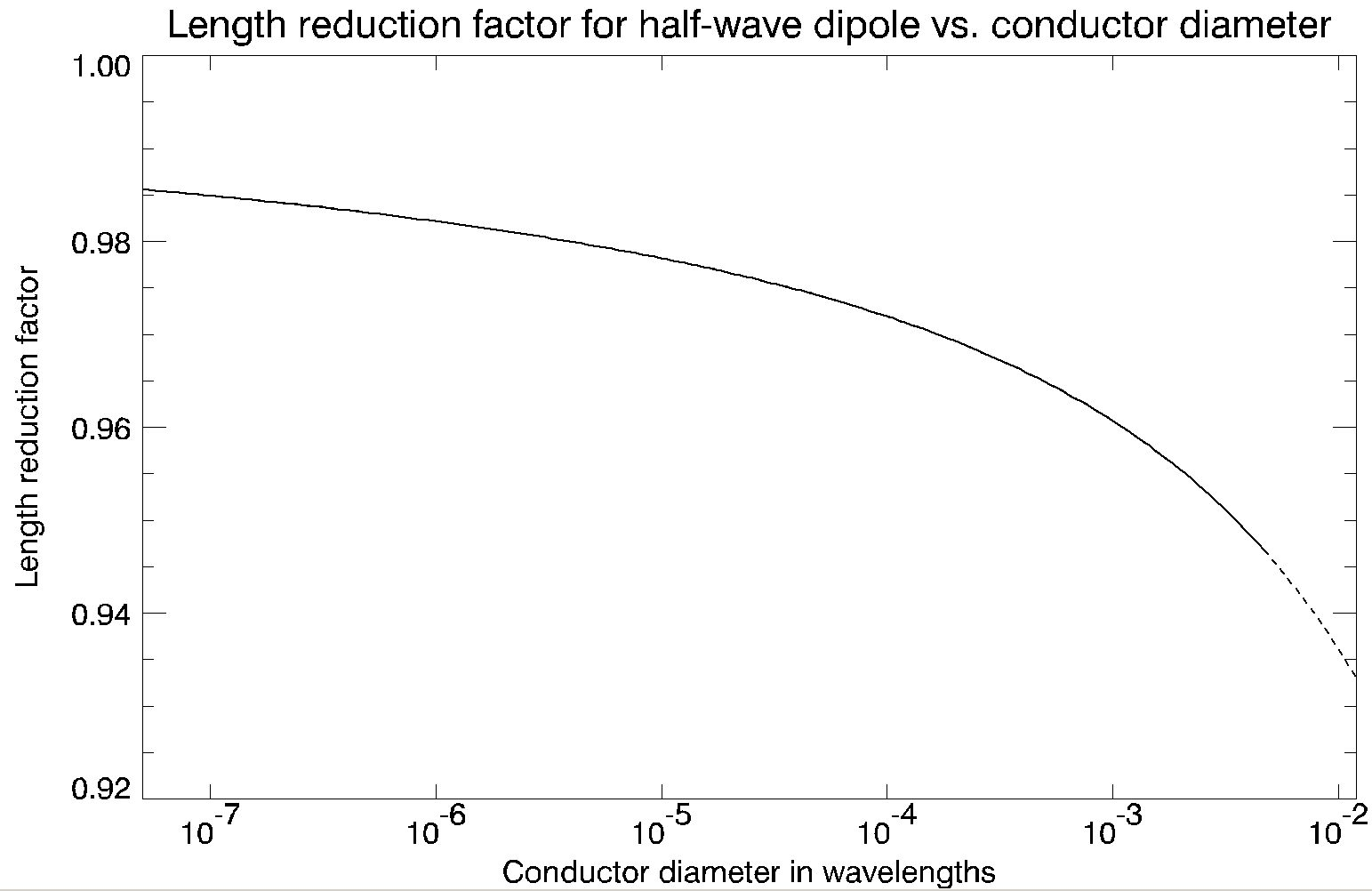
Length reduction factor for a half-wave dipole to achieve electrical resonance (purely resistive feedpoint impedance). Calculated using the induced EMF method, an approximation that breaks down at larger conductor diameters (dashed portion of graph).

For a typical k of about 0.95, the above formula for the corrected antenna length can be written, for a length in meters as 143/ f , or a length in feet as 468/ f where f is the frequency in megahertz.

Dipole antennas of lengths approximately equal to any odd multiple of 1/ 2 λ are also resonant, presenting little or no reactance (which can be removed by making a small length adjustment). However, these are rarely used. One size that is a much more efficient radiator both in terms of Watts out and in direction radiated is a dipole with a length of 5/ 4 wave. Not being close to 3/ 2 wave, this antenna's impedance has a large (negative) reactance and can only be used with an inductive impedance matching network (a tapped loading coil or a so-called antenna tuner). It is a desirable length because such an antenna has the highest gain for any dipole which isn't a great deal longer.

=== Radiation pattern and gain ===
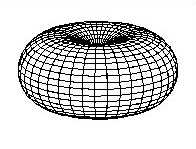
Three dimensional radiation pattern of a vertical half-wave dipole antenna.

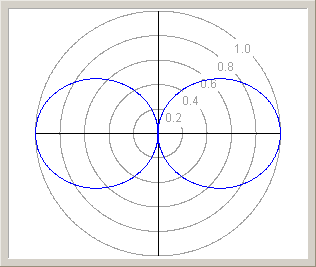
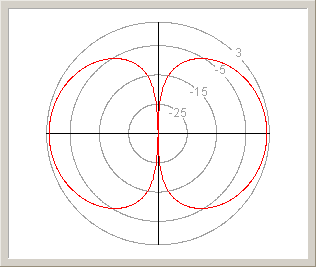
Radiation pattern of vertical half-wave dipole; vertical section.
(top) In linear scale
(bottom) In decibels isotropic (dBi)

A dipole is omnidirectional in the plane perpendicular to the wire axis, with the radiation falling to zero on the axis (off the ends of the antenna). In a half-wave dipole, the radiation is maximum perpendicular to the antenna, declining as $\ (\ \sin \theta\ )^2\$ to zero on the axis. Its radiation pattern in three dimensions (see figure) would be plotted approximately as a toroid (doughnut shape) symmetric about the conductor. When mounted vertically this results in maximum radiation in horizontal directions. When mounted horizontally, the radiation peaks at right angles (90°) to the conductor, with nulls in the direction of the dipole.

Neglecting electrical inefficiency, the antenna gain is equal to the directive gain, which is 1.50 (1.76 dBi or -0.39 dBd) for a short dipole, increasing to 1.64 (2.15 dBi or 0 dBd) for a half-wave dipole. For a 5/ 4 wave dipole the gain further increases to about 5.2 dBi, making this length desirable for that reason even though the antenna is then off-resonance. Longer dipoles than that have radiation patterns that are multi-lobed, with poorer gain (unless they are much longer) even along the strongest lobe. Other enhancements to the dipole (such as including a corner reflector or an array of dipoles) can be considered when more substantial directivity is desired. Such antenna designs, although based on the half-wave dipole, generally acquire their own names.

=== Feeding a dipole antenna ===
Ideally, a half-wave dipole should be fed using a balanced transmission line matching its typical 65–70 Ω input impedance. Twin lead with a similar impedance is available but seldom used and does not match the balanced antenna terminals of most radio and television receivers. Much more common is the use of common 300 Ω twin lead in conjunction with a folded dipole. The driving point impedance of a half-wave folded dipole is 4 times that of a simple half-wave dipole, thus closely matching that 300 Ω characteristic impedance. Most FM broadcast band tuners and older analog televisions include balanced 300 Ω antenna input terminals. However twin lead has the drawback that it is electrically disturbed by any other nearby conductor (including earth); when used for transmitting, care must be taken not to place it near other conductors.

Many types of coaxial cable (or coax) have a characteristic impedance of 75 Ω, which would otherwise be a good match for a half-wave dipole. However, coax is a single-ended line whereas a center-fed dipole expects a balanced line (such as twin lead). By symmetry, one can see that the dipole's terminals have an equal but opposite voltage, whereas coax has one conductor grounded. Using coax regardless results in an unbalanced line, in which the currents along the two conductors of the transmission line are no longer equal and opposite. Since you then have a net current along the transmission line, the transmission line becomes an antenna itself, with unpredictable results (since it depends on the path of the transmission line). This will generally alter the antenna's intended radiation pattern, and change the impedance seen at the transmitter or receiver.

A balun is required to use coaxial cable with a dipole antenna. The balun transfers power between the single-ended coax and the balanced antenna, sometimes with an additional change in impedance. A balun can be implemented as a transformer which also allows for an impedance transformation. This is usually wound on a ferrite toroidal core. The toroid core material must be suitable for the frequency of use, and in a transmitting antenna it must be of sufficient size to avoid saturation. Other balun designs are mentioned below.

Feeding a dipole antenna with coax cable

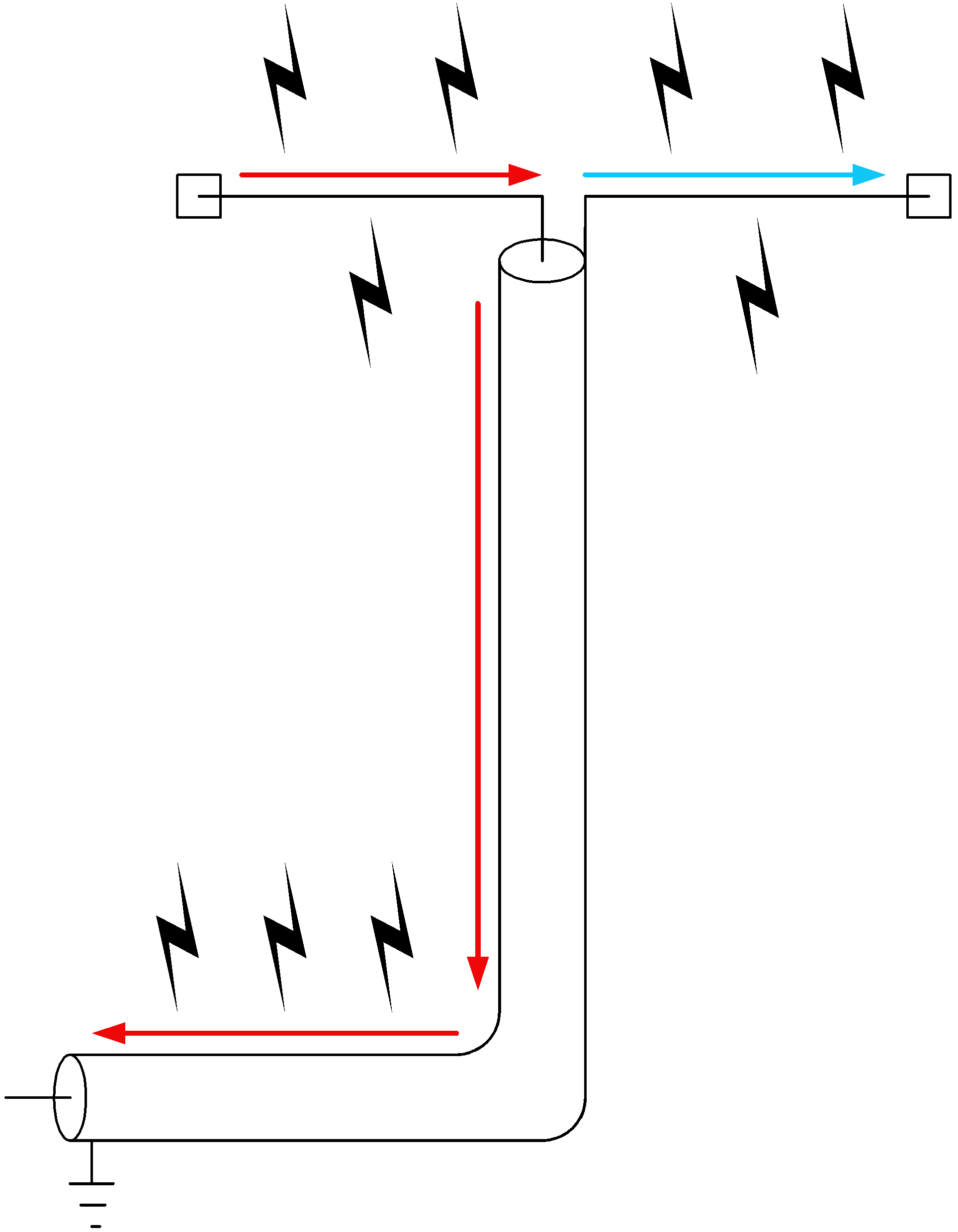
Coax and antenna both acting as radiators instead of only the antenna

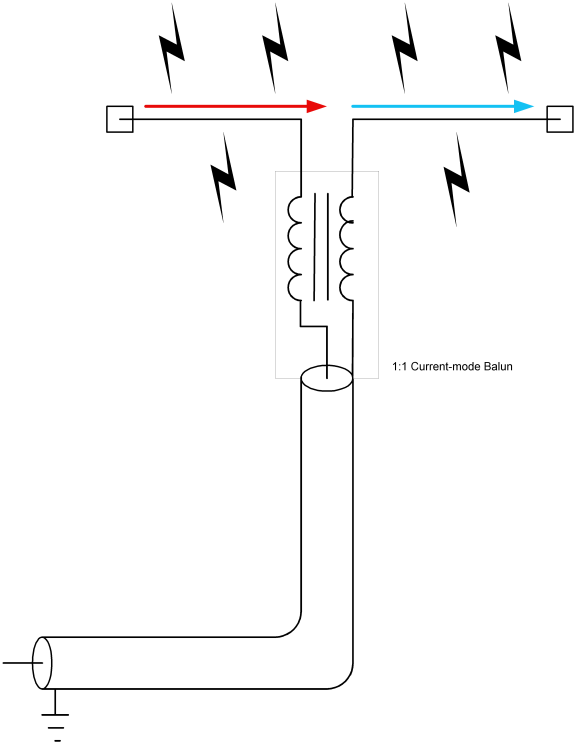
Dipole with a current balun

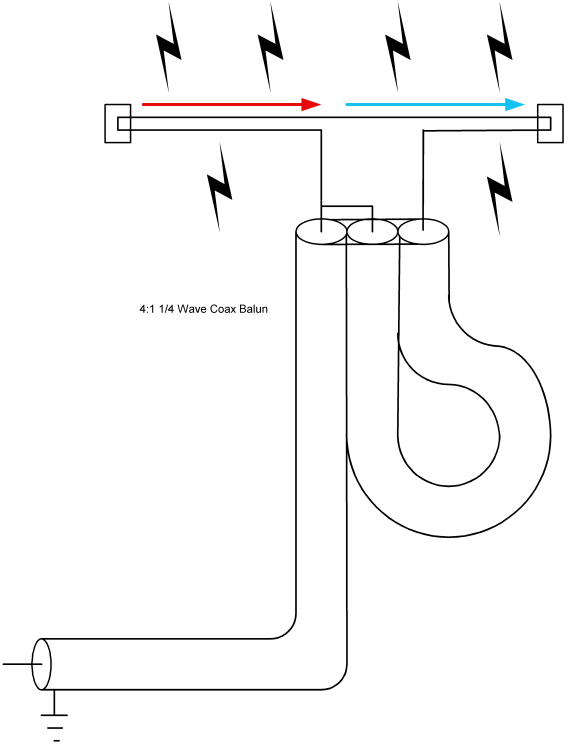
A folded dipole (300 Ω) to coax (75 Ω) 4:1 halfwave balun

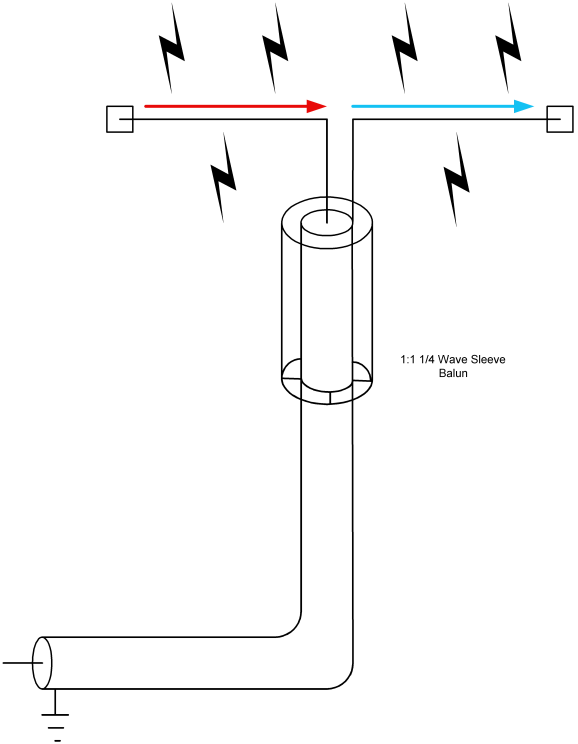
Dipole using a sleeve balun

==== Current balun ====
A current balun uses a transformer wound on a toroid or rod of magnetic material such as ferrite. All of the current seen at the input goes into one terminal of the balanced antenna. It forms a balun by choking common-mode current. The material isn't critical for 1:1 because there is no transformer action applied to the desired differential current. A related design involves two transformers and includes a 1:4 impedance transformation.

==== Coax balun ====
A coax balun is a cost-effective method of eliminating feeder radiation but is limited to a narrow set of operating frequencies.

One easy way to make a balun is to use a length of coaxial cable equal to half a wavelength. The inner core of the cable is linked at each end to one of the balanced connections for a feeder or dipole. One of these terminals should be connected to the inner core of the coaxial feeder. All three braids should be connected together. This then forms a 4:1 balun, which works correctly at only a narrow band of frequencies.

==== Sleeve balun ====
At VHF frequencies, a sleeve balun can also be built to remove feeder radiation.

Another narrow-band design is to use a 1/ 4 λ length of metal pipe. The coaxial cable is placed inside the pipe; at one end the braid is wired to the pipe while at the other end no connection is made to the pipe. The balanced end of this balun is at the end where no connection is made to the pipe. The 1/ 4 λ conductor acts as a transformer, converting the zero impedance at the short to the braid into an infinite impedance at the open end. This infinite impedance at the open end of the pipe prevents current flowing into the outer coax formed by the outside of the inner coax shield and the pipe, forcing the current to remain in the inside coax. This balun design is impractical for low frequencies because of the long length of pipe that will be needed.

== Common applications ==
=== "Rabbit ears" TV antenna ===
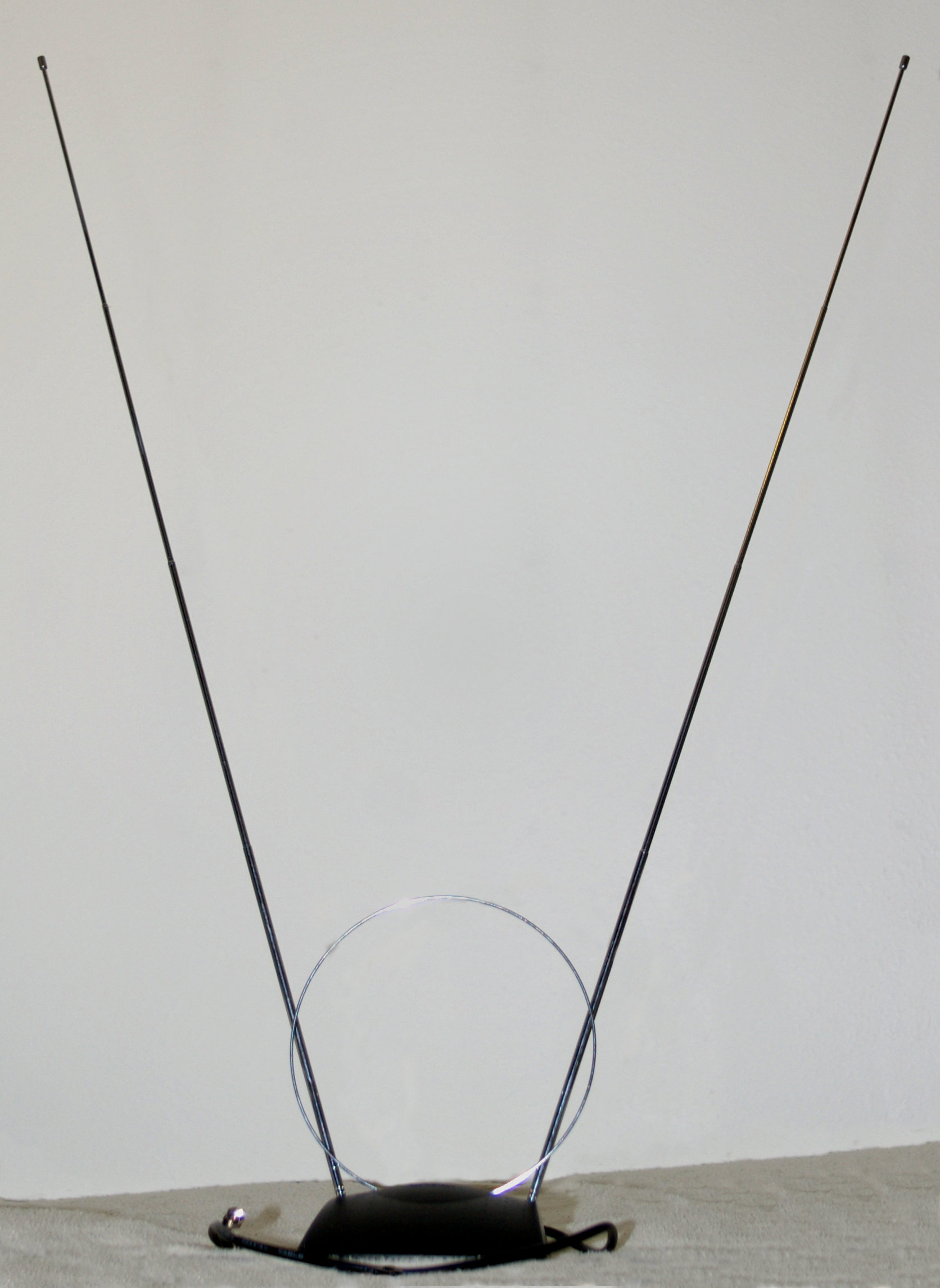
"Rabbit-ears" VHF television antenna (the small loop is a separate UHF antenna).

One of the most common applications of the dipole antenna is the rabbit ears or bunny ears television antenna, found atop broadcast television receivers. It is used to receive the VHF terrestrial television bands, consisting in the US of 54–88 MHz (band I) and 174–216 MHz (band III), with wavelengths of 5.5–1.4 meters (18 feet to 4 feet 8 inches). Since this frequency range is much wider than a single fixed dipole antenna can cover, it is made with several degrees of adjustment. It is constructed of two telescoping rods that can each be extended out to about 1 meters (3 feet) length (one-quarter wavelength at 75 MHz). With control over the segments' length, angle with respect to vertical, and compass angle, one has much more flexibility in optimizing reception than available with a rooftop antenna even if equipped with an antenna rotor.

=== FM-broadcast-receiving antennas ===
In contrast to the wide television frequency bands, the FM broadcast band (88-108 MHz) is narrow enough that a dipole antenna can cover it. For fixed use in homes, hi-fi tuners are typically supplied with simple folded dipoles resonant near the center of that band. The feedpoint impedance of a folded dipole, which is quadruple the impedance of a simple dipole, is a good match for 300 Ω twin lead, so that is usually used for the transmission line to the tuner. A common construction is to make the arms of the folded dipole out of twin lead also, shorted at their ends. This flexible antenna can be conveniently taped or nailed to walls, following the contours of moldings.

=== Shortwave antenna ===
Horizontal wire dipole antennas are popular for use on the HF shortwave bands, both for transmitting and shortwave listening. They are usually constructed of two lengths of wire joined by a strain insulator in the center, which is the feedpoint. The ends can be attached to existing buildings, structures, or trees, taking advantage of their heights. If used for transmitting, it is essential that the ends of the antenna be attached to supports through strain insulators with a sufficiently high flashover voltage, since the antenna's high-voltage antinodes occur there. Being a balanced antenna, they are best fed with a balun between the (coax) transmission line and the feedpoint.

These are simple to put up for temporary or field use. But they are also widely used by radio amateurs and short wave listeners in fixed locations due to their simple (and inexpensive) construction, while still realizing a resonant antenna at frequencies where resonant antenna elements need to be of quite some size. They are an attractive solution for these frequencies, when significant directionality is not desired, and the cost of several such resonant antennas for different frequency bands, built at home, may still be much less than a single commercially produced antenna.

=== Dipole towers ===
Antennas for MF and LF radio stations are usually constructed as mast radiators, in which the vertical mast itself forms the antenna. Although mast radiators are most commonly monopoles, some are dipoles. The metal structure of the mast is divided at its midpoint into two insulated sections to make a vertical dipole, which is driven at the midpoint.

=== Dipole arrays ===
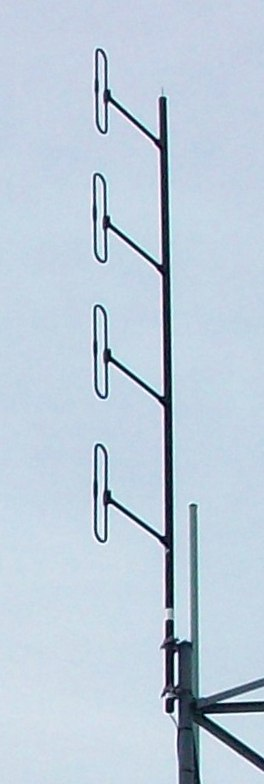
Collinear folded dipole array

Many types of array antennas are constructed using multiple dipoles, usually half-wave dipoles. The purpose of using multiple dipoles is to increase the directional gain of the antenna over the gain of a single dipole; the radiation of the separate dipoles interferes to enhance power radiated in desired directions. In arrays with multiple dipole driven elements, the feedline is split using an electrical network in order to provide power to the elements, with careful attention paid to the relative phase delays due to transmission between the common point and each element.

In order to increase antenna gain in horizontal directions (at the expense of radiation towards the sky or towards the ground) one can stack antennas in the vertical direction in a broadside array where the antennas are fed in phase. Doing so with horizontal dipole antennas retains those dipoles' directionality and null in the direction of their elements. However, if each dipole is vertically oriented, in a so-called collinear antenna array (see graphic), that null direction becomes vertical and the array acquires an omnidirectional radiation pattern (in the horizontal plane) as is typically desired. Vertical collinear arrays are used in the VHF and UHF frequency bands at which wavelengths the size of the elements are small enough to practically stack several on a mast. They are a higher-gain alternative to quarter-wave ground plane antennas used in fixed base stations for mobile two-way radios, such as police, fire, and taxi dispatchers.

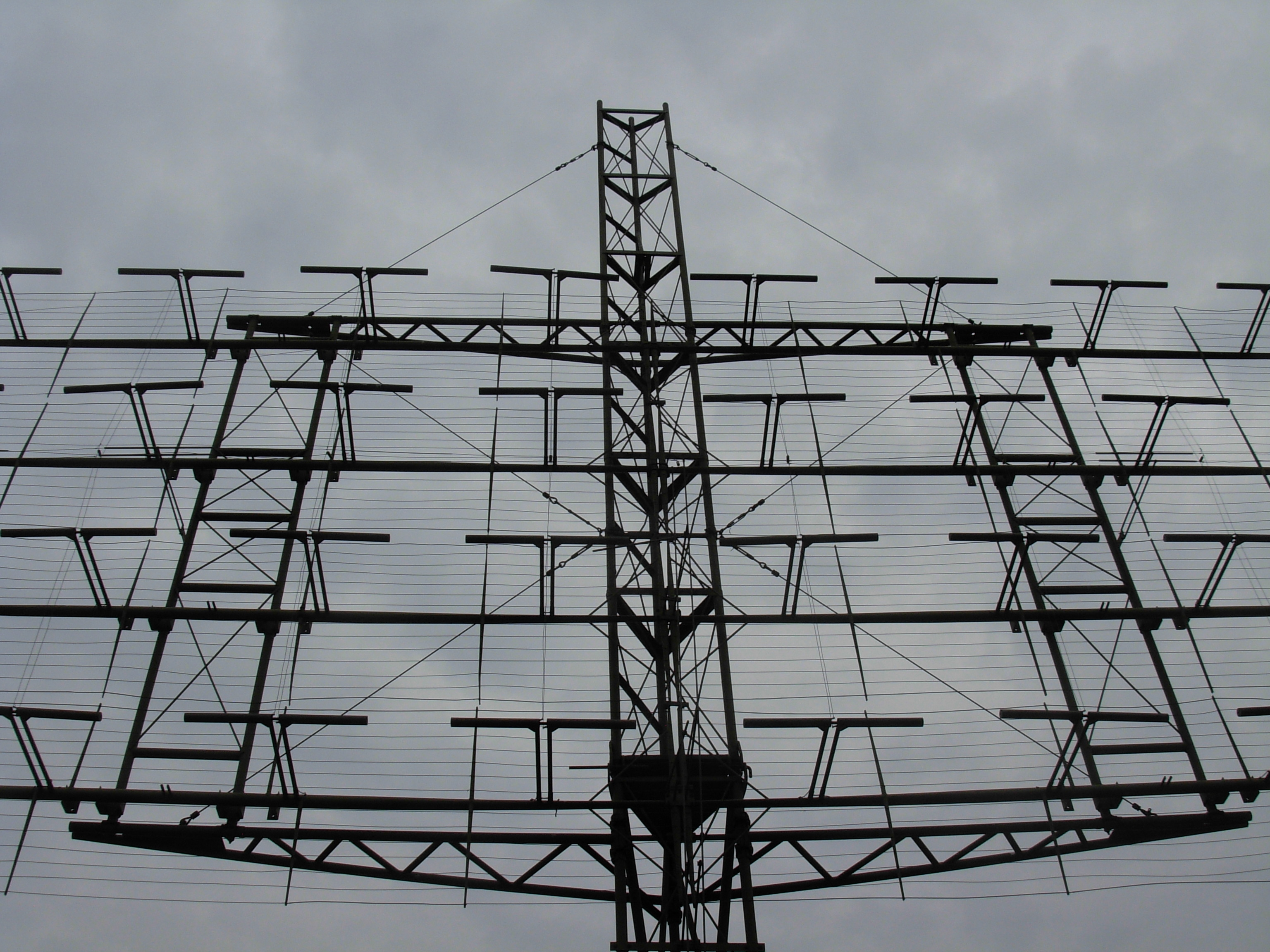
A reflective array antenna for radar consisting of numerous dipoles fed in-phase (thus realizing a broadside array) in front of a large reflector (horizontal wires) to make it uni-directional

On the other hand, for a rotating antenna (or one used only towards a particular direction) one may desire increased gain and directivity in a particular horizontal direction. If the broadside array discussed above (whether collinear or not) is turned horizontal, then the one obtains a greater gain in the horizontal direction perpendicular to the antennas, at the expense of most other directions. Unfortunately, that also means that the direction opposite the desired direction also has a high gain, whereas high gain is usually desired in one single direction. The power that is wasted in the reverse direction, however, can be redirected, for instance by using a large planar reflector, as is accomplished in the reflective array antenna, increasing the gain in the desired direction by another 3 dB

An alternative realization of a uni-directional antenna is the end-fire array. In this case the dipoles are again side by side (but not collinear), but fed in progressing phases, arranged so that their waves add coherently in one direction but cancel in the opposite direction. So now, rather than being perpendicular to the array direction as in a broadside array, the directivity is in the array direction (i.e. the direction of the line connecting their feedpoints) but with one of the opposite directions suppressed.

=== Yagi antennas ===
The above-described antennas with multiple driven elements require a complex feed system of signal splitting, phasing, distribution to the elements, and impedance matching. A different sort of end-fire array which is much more often used is based on the use of so-called parasitic elements. In the popular high-gain Yagi antenna, only one of the dipoles is actually connected electrically, but the others receive and reradiate power supplied by the driven element. This time, the phasing is accomplished by careful choice of the lengths as well as positions of the parasitic elements, in order to concentrate gain in one direction and largely cancel radiation in the opposite direction (as well as all other directions). Although the realized gain is less than a driven array with the same number of elements, the simplicity of the electrical connections makes the Yagi more practical for consumer applications.

=== Dipole as a reference standard ===
Antenna gain is frequently measured as decibels relative to a half-wave dipole. One reason is that practical antenna measurements need a reference strength to compare the field strength of an antenna under test at a particular distance to. While there is no such thing as an isotropic radiator, the half-wave dipole is well understood and behaved, and can be constructed to be nearly 100% efficient. It is also a fairer comparison, since the gain obtained by the dipole itself is essentially "free," given that almost no antenna design has a smaller directive gain.

For a gain measured relative to a dipole, one says the antenna has a gain of "x dBd" (see Decibel). More often, gains are expressed relative to an isotropic radiator, making the gain seem higher. In consideration of the known gain of a half-wave dipole, 0 dBd is defined as 2.15 dBi; all gains in "dBi" are shifted 2.15 higher than gains in "dBd".

== Hertzian dipole ==
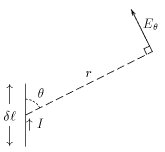
Hertzian dipole of tiny length $\ \delta\ell\ ,$ with current $\ I\ ,$ and field sensed at a distance $\ r\$ in the $\theta\$ direction

The Hertzian dipole or elementary doublet refers to a theoretical construction, rather than a physical antenna design: It is an idealized tiny segment of conductor carrying a RF current with constant amplitude and direction along its entire (short) length; a real antenna can be modeled as the combination of many Hertzian dipoles laid end-to-end.

The Hertzian dipole may be defined as a finite oscillating current (in a specified direction) of $\ I\ e^{i\omega t}\$ over a tiny or infinitesimal length $\ \delta\ell\$ at a specified position. The solution of the fields from a Hertzian dipole can be used as the basis for analytical or numerical calculation of the radiation from more complex antenna geometries (such as practical dipoles) by forming the superposition of fields from a large number of Hertzian dipoles comprising the current pattern of the actual antenna. As a function of position, taking the elementary current elements $\ I\!\left(\mathbf{r}\right)\ ,$ multiplied by infinitesimal lengths $\ \delta\ell\ ,$ the resulting field pattern then reduces to an integral over the path of an antenna conductor (modeled as a thin wire).

For the following derivation, we shall take the current to be in the $\ z\$ direction, centered at the origin where $\ x = y = z = 0\ ,$ with the sinusoidal time dependence $\ e^{i \omega t}\$ for all quantities being understood. The simplest approach is to use the calculation of the vector potential $\ \mathbf{A}\!\left(\mathbf{r}\right)\$ using the formula for the retarded potential. Although the value of $\ \mathbf{A}\$ is not unique, we shall constrain it by adopting the Lorenz gauge, and assuming sinusoidal current at radian frequency $\ \omega\$ the retardation of the field is converted just into a phase factor $\ e^{-ikr}\ ,$ where the wave number $\ k = \frac{\omega}{\ c\ }\$ in free space and $\ r\$ is the linear distance between the point being considered to the origin (where we assumed the current source to be), so $\ r \equiv \left|\ \mathbf{r}\ \right| ~.$ This results in a vector potential $\ \mathbf{A}\$ at position $\ \mathbf{r}\$ due to that current element only, which we find is purely in the $\ z\$ direction (the direction of the current):

$$\mathbf{A}\!\left(\mathbf{r}\right) = I\ \delta\ell\ \frac{\mu_0}{\ 4\pi r\ }\ e^{-ikr}\ \hat\mathbf{z}\$$

where $\ \mu_0\$ is the permeability of free space. Then using

$$\ \mu\mathbf{H} = \mathbf{B} = \nabla\times\mathbf{A}\$$

we can solve for the magnetic field $\ \mathbf{H}\ ,$ and from that (dependent on us having chosen the Lorenz gauge) the electric field $\ \mathbf{E}\$ using

$$\mathbf{E} = \frac{\ \nabla\times\mathbf{H}\ }{i\omega\epsilon}$$

In spherical coordinates we find that the magnetic field $\ \mathbf{H}\$ has only a component in the $\ \phi\$ direction:

$$\mathbf{H} = H_\phi\ \hat\boldsymbol\phi$$

where

$$H_\phi = i\frac{\ I\ \delta\ell\ }{4\pi}\left(\frac{\ k\ }{r} - \frac{i}{\ r^2}\right)\ e^{-ikr}\ \sin \theta \ ,$$

while the electric field has components both in the $\ \theta\$ and $\ r\$ directions:

$$\mathbf{E} = E_\theta\ \hat\boldsymbol\theta + E_r\ \hat\mathbf r$$

where

$$\begin{align}
E_\theta &= i\frac{\ \zeta_0\ I\ \delta\ell\ }{4\pi}\left(\frac{\ k\ }{r} - \frac{i}{\ r^2} - \frac{1}{\ k\ r^3}\right)\ e^{-ikr}\ \sin \theta \ , \\[2pt]
E_r &= \frac{\ \zeta_0\ I\ \delta\ell\ }{2\pi}\left(\frac{1}{\ r^2\ } - \frac{i}{\ kr^3}\right)\ e^{-ikr}\ \cos \theta \ ,
\end{align}$$

with $\ \zeta_0 \equiv \sqrt{\frac{\ \mu_0\ }{\epsilon_0}\;}\$ is the impedance of free space.

Animated diagram showing how the E and H fields in the x y plane depend on both time and distance

This solution includes near field terms that are very strong near the source but which are not radiated. As seen in the accompanying animation, the $\ \mathbf{E}\$ and $\ \mathbf{H}\$ fields very close to the source are almost 90° out of phase, thus contributing very little to the Poynting vector by which radiated flux is computed. The near field solution for an antenna element (from the integral using this formula over the length of that element) is the field that can be used to compute the mutual impedance between it and another nearby element.

For computation of the far field radiation pattern, the above equations are simplified as only the $\ \frac{\ 1\ }{ r }\$ terms remain significant:

$$\begin{align}
H_\phi &= i\frac{\ I\ \delta\ell\ k\ }{4 \pi r}\ e^{-ikr}\ \sin \theta \ , \\[2pt]
E_\theta &= i\frac{\ \zeta_0\ I\ \delta\ell\ k\ }{4 \pi r}\ e^{-ikr}\ \sin \theta ~.
\end{align}$$

Electric field lines and magnetic field components at right angles composing the electromagnetic wave radiated by the current element

The far-field pattern is thus seen to consist of a transverse electromagnetic (TEM) wave, with electric and magnetic fields at right angles to each other and at right angles to the direction of propagation (the direction of $\ \mathbf{r}\$, as we assumed the source to be at the origin). The electric polarization, in the $\theta$ direction, is coplanar with the source current (in the $\ z\$ direction), while the magnetic field is at right angles to that, in the $\ \phi\$ direction. It can be seen from these equations, and also in the animation, that the fields at these distances are exactly in phase. Both fields fall according to $\ \frac{\ 1\ }{ r }\ ,$ with the power thus falling according to $\ \frac{1}{\ r^2}\$ as dictated by the inverse square law.

=== Radiation resistance ===
If one knows the far field radiation pattern due to a given antenna current, then it is possible to compute the radiation resistance directly. For the above fields due to the Hertzian dipole, we can compute the power flux according to the Poynting vector, resulting in a power (as averaged over one cycle) of:

$$\langle\mathbf{S}\rangle = \frac{\ 1\ }{ 2 } \mathcal{R_e}\left\{\ \mathbf{E}\times\mathbf{H}^*\ \right\} = \langle S_\mathsf{r} \rangle \ \hat\mathbf{r} + \langle S_\mathsf{\phi}\rangle\ \hat\boldsymbol{\phi} ~.$$

With increasing $\ r\$ the $\ \langle S_\mathsf{\phi}\rangle\$ becomes insignificantly small compared to the $\ \langle S_\mathsf{r}\rangle\$ component. Although not required, it is easiest to only work with the asymptotic value that $\ \langle S_\mathsf{r} \rangle\$ approaches at a large $\ r\$ using the simpler far-field expressions for $\ \mathbf{E}\$ and $\ \mathbf{H} ~.$ Consider a large sphere surrounding the source with a radius $\ r ~.$ We find the power per unit area crossing the surface of that sphere in the $\ \hat\mathbf{r}\$ direction is:

$$\left\langle S_\mathsf{r}\right\rangle = \frac{\ \zeta_0\ }{2}\ \left( \frac{\ \left|I\right|\ k\ \delta\ell\ }{4 \pi r}\ \sin \theta \right)^2\$$

Integration of this flux over the complete sphere results in:

$$\begin{align}
P_\mathsf{net}
&= \int_0^{2\pi}\!\!\int_0^{\pi} \left|\langle S_\mathsf{r} \rangle\right|\ r^2\sin\theta\ \mathrm{d}{\phi}\ \mathrm{d}\theta \\
&= \tfrac{\ 1\ }{2}\zeta_0\ \left(\frac{\ \left|I\right|\ k\ \delta\ell\ }{4 \pi } \right)^2 \int_0^{2\pi}\!\!\int_0^{\pi} \sin^3\theta\ \mathrm{d}{\phi}\ \mathrm{d}\theta \\
&= \frac{\zeta_0}{\ 12\pi\ }\left(\left|I\right|\ k\ \delta\ell\right)^2 = \frac{\ \pi\ }{3}\zeta_0\ \left(\left|I\right|\frac{\ \delta\ell\ }{\lambda}\right)^2
\end{align}$$

where $\ \lambda = 2\pi/k\$ is the free space wavelength corresponding to the radian frequency $\ \omega ~.$ By definition, the radiation resistance $R_\text{rad}$ times the average of the square of the current $\ \tfrac{\ 1\ }{ 2 }\left|\ I\ \right|^2\$ is the net power radiated due to that current, so equating the above to $\ \tfrac{\ 1\ }{2}\left|I\right|^2 R_\text{rad}\$ we find:

$$R_\text{rad} = \tfrac{\ 2\ \pi\ }{ 3 } \zeta_0\ \left(\frac{\ \delta\ell\ }{\lambda}\right)^2 ~.$$

This method can be used to compute the radiation resistance for any antenna whose far-field radiation pattern has been found in terms of a specific antenna current. If ohmic losses in the conductors are neglected, the radiation resistance (considered relative to the feedpoint) is identical to the resistive (real) component of the feedpoint impedance. Unfortunately, this exercise tells us nothing about the reactive (imaginary) component of feedpoint impedance, whose calculation is considered below.

=== Directive gain ===
Using the above expression for the radiated flux given by the Poynting vector, it is also possible to compute the directive gain of the Hertzian dipole. Dividing the total power computed above by $4\pi r^2$ we can find the flux averaged over all directions $\ P_\text{avg}\$ as

$$\ P_\text{avg} = \frac{P_\text{net}}{\ 4\pi\ r^2} = \frac{\zeta_0}{\ 48\pi^2\ r^2}k^2\ \left|I\right|^2\ \left(\delta\ell\right)^2~.$$

Dividing the flux radiated in a particular direction by $\ P_\text{avg}\$ we obtain the directive gain $\ \operatorname\mathsf{G}\left(\theta\right)\ :$

$$\ \operatorname\mathsf{G}\left(\theta\right) = \frac{\ \left\langle\mathbf{S}_\mathsf{r}\right\rangle\ }{P_\text{avg}} = \tfrac{\ 3\ }{2}\sin^2\theta\$$

The commonly quoted antenna "gain", meaning the peak value of the gain pattern (radiation pattern), is found to be 1.5~1.76 dBi, lower than practically any other antenna configuration.

=== Comparison with the short dipole ===
The Hertzian dipole is similar to but differs from the short dipole, discussed above. In both cases the conductor is very short compared to a wavelength, so the standing wave pattern present on a half-wave dipole (for instance) is absent. However, with the Hertzian dipole we specified that the current along that conductor is constant over its short length. This makes the Hertzian dipole useful for analysis of more complex antenna configurations, where every infinitesimal section of that real antenna's conductor can be modeled as a Hertzian dipole with the current found to be flowing in that real antenna.

However a short conductor fed with a RF voltage will not have a uniform current even along that short range. Rather, a short dipole in real life has a current equal to the feedpoint current at the feedpoint but falling linearly to zero over the length of that short conductor. By placing a capacitive hat, such as a metallic ball, at the end of the conductor, it is possible for its self capacitance to absorb the current from the conductor and better approximate the constant current assumed for the Hertzian dipole. But again, the Hertzian dipole is meant only as a theoretical construct for antenna analysis.

The short dipole, with a feedpoint current of $\ I_0\ ,$ has an average current over each conductor of only $\ \tfrac{\ 1\ }{ 2 }\ I_0 ~.$ The above field equations for the Hertzian dipole of length $\ \delta\ell\$ would then predict the actual fields for a short dipole using that effective current $\ I = \tfrac{\ 1\ }{ 2 }\ I_0 ~.$ This would result in a power measured in the far field of one quarter that given by the above equation for the magnitude of the Poynting vector $\ \langle S_\mathsf{r}\rangle\$ if we had assumed an element current of $\ I_0 ~.$ Consequently, it can be seen that the radiation resistance computed for the short dipole is one quarter of that computed above for the Hertzian dipole. But their radiation patterns (and gains) are otherwise identical.

== Detailed calculation of dipole feedpoint impedance ==
The impedance seen at the feedpoint of a dipole of various lengths has been plotted above, in terms of the real (resistive) component R_{dipole} and the imaginary (reactive) component j X_{dipole} of that impedance. For the case of an antenna with perfect conductors (no Ohmic loss), R_{dipole} is identical to the radiation resistance, which can more easily be computed from the total power in the far-field radiation pattern for a given applied current as we showed for the short dipole. The calculation of X_{dipole} is more difficult.

=== Induced EMF method ===
Using the induced EMF method closed form expressions are obtained for both components of the feedpoint impedance; such results are plotted above. The solution depends on an assumption for the form of the current distribution along the antenna conductors. For wavelength-to-element diameter ratios greater than about 60, the current distribution along each antenna element of length 1/ 2 L is very well approximated as having the form of the sine function at points along the antenna z, with the current reaching zero at the elements' ends, where z = ± 1/2 L , as follows:

$$\ I(z) = A \sin\Bigl(\ k \left( \tfrac{\ 1\ }{2}\ L - \left| z \right| \right)\ \Bigr)\ ,$$

where k is the wavenumber given by k = (2 π)/ λ = (2 π f)/ c , and the amplitude A is set to match a specified driving point current at z = 0 .

In cases where an approximately sinusoidal current distribution can be assumed, this method solves for the driving point impedance in closed form using the cosine and sine integral functions Si(x) and Ci(x) . For a dipole of total length L , the resistive and reactive components of the driving point impedance can be expressed as: (Note: This computation using the induced EMF method is identical to the computation of the mutual impedance between two dipoles (with infinitesimal conductor radius) separated by the distance a . Because the field at or beyond the edge of an antenna's cylindrical conductor at a distance a is only dependent on the current distribution along the conductor, and not the radius of the conductor, that field is used to compute the mutual impedance between that filamentary antenna and the actual position of the conductor with a radius a .)

$$\begin{align}
R_\mathsf{dipole} = \frac{ \zeta_0 }{\ 2 \pi \sin^2\left(\tfrac{1}{2} k L \right)\ } \Biggl\{\
\gamma_e + \ln( k L ) - \operatorname{Ci}( k L ) + {} &\tfrac{1}{2} \sin( k L )\,\Bigl[ +\operatorname{Si}( 2 k L ) - 2\operatorname{Si}( k L )\  \Bigr] \\
{} + {} &\tfrac{1}{2} \cos( k L )\,\Big[ +\operatorname{Ci}( 2 k L ) - 2\operatorname{Ci}( k L ) + \gamma_e + \ln\left( \tfrac{1}{2}kL \right)\ \Bigr]
\ \Bigg\}\ , \\
X_\mathsf{dipole} = \frac{ \zeta_0 }{\ 2 \pi \sin^2\left( \tfrac{1}{2} k L \right)\ } \Biggl\{ {}
+ \operatorname{Si}( k L ) + {} &\tfrac{1}{2}\cos( k L )\,\Bigl[ - \operatorname{Si}( 2 k L ) + 2\operatorname{Si}( k L )\ \Bigr] \\
{} + {} &\tfrac{1}{2}\sin( k L )\,\Bigl[ +\operatorname{Ci}( 2 k L ) - 2\operatorname{Ci}( k L ) + \operatorname{Ci} \left(\tfrac{\; 2 k a^2\ }{ L }\right)\ \Bigr]
\ \Biggr\}\ ,
\end{align}$$

where a is the radius of the conductors, k is again the wavenumber as defined above, ζ_{0} is the impedance of empty space, which very nearly the same as impedance of air: ζ_{0} ≈ 377 Ω , and $\ \gamma_e = 0.57721566\ \ldots \$ is Euler's constant. There is an equivalent alternate form favored by some authors that uses a different function, Cin . (Note: The form that uses the function Cin instead of Ci works better for dipoles whose single-arms are each no longer than a quarter-wave. The function Ci diverges ("blows up") for input values approaching zero, near the tips of the dipole, where the antenna's impedance does indeed get very large, but not actually infinite. (Calculating electrical behavior at the dipole tips is important, in part since when voltages get too high, corona discharge will waste some transmit power.) Switching to the Cin form splits out the divergent parts of Ci into a few, separate logarithmic terms, similar to the logarithm in the Ci form, shown above. Many of the new logarithmic terms introduced by switching to the Cin form wind up canceling with each other, and leave behind only a few stray constants. Once separated out, the remaining logarithms that do not cancel still diverge, but can be dealt with fairly easily for values near zero (near the dipole tips); the function Cin quietly vanishes by quadratically converging to zero. However, for values of the function argument 2 k L near 130° and beyond (so near the feed-point of dipoles longer than a quarter-wave) the function Ci is much more well-behaved: It's close to being flat. In contrast, near the feedpoints of long antennas, the formerly docile function Cin begins an erratic but persistent growth to very large values, which numerically complicates feedpoint impedance calculation for dipoles longer a quarter-wave – of which, the 5/ 4 wave dipole has particularly good performance for long-distance use, but needs careful calculations to accurately design a minimal impedance matching system that the antenna's reactive feedpoint needs. For large arguments the functions Ci and Si used above softly (diminishing amplitude) oscillate around zero and 1/ 2 π , respectively. So neither form, either the form using Ci or the form using Cin, is always a better choice for all locations on all sizes of antenna.)

=== Integral methods ===
The induced EMF method is dependent on the assumption of a sinusoidal current distribution, delivering an accuracy better than about 10% as long as the wavelength-to-element diameter ratio is greater than about 60. However, for yet larger conductors numerical solutions are required which solve for the conductor's current distribution (rather than assuming a sinusoidal pattern). This can be based on approximating solutions for either Pocklington's integrodifferential equation or the Hallén integral equation. These approaches also have greater generality, not being limited to linear conductors.

Numerical solution of either is performed using the moment method solution which requires expansion of that current into a set of basis functions; one simple (but not the best) choice, for instance, is to break up the conductor into N segments with a constant current assumed along each. After setting an appropriate weighting function the cost may be minimized through the inversion of a N×N matrix. Determination of each matrix element requires at least one double integration involving the weighting functions, which may become computationally intensive. These are simplified if the weighting functions are simply delta functions, which corresponds to fitting the boundary conditions for the current along the conductor at only N discrete points. Then the N×N matrix must be inverted, which is also computationally intensive as N increases. In one simple example, Balanis (2011) performs this computation to find the antenna impedance with different N using Pocklington's method, and finds that with N > 60 the solutions approach their limiting values to within a few percent.

== See also ==
- AM broadcasting
- Amateur radio
- Balun
- Coaxial antenna
- Dipole field strength in free space
- Driven element
- Babinet's principle
- Electronic symbol
- FM broadcasting
- Isotropic antenna
- Omnidirectional antenna
- Shortwave listening
- T-antenna
- Whip antenna

== Sources for elementary, short, and half-wave dipoles ==
- Terman, Frederick E.; Helliwell, Robert (1955). Electronic Radio and Engineering (4th ed.). MacGraw-Hill. ISBN 978-0-07-085795-7.
- Feynman, Richard. Leighton; Sands (eds.). Feynman's Lectures on Physics. Addison-Wesley.
- Panofsky, W.; Phillips, M. Classical Electricity and Magnetism. Addison-Wesley.
- Orfanidis, Sophocles J. Electromagnetic Waves and Antennas (online textbook manuscript). Rutgers University. Archived from the original on 20 December 2008 – via ece.rutgers.edu.
- N0HR. "Wire antenna resources for ham radio". n0hr.com. — Wire antenna web links including off center fed dipole (OCFD), dipole calculators and construction sites
- "Linear antennas" (PDF). stevens-tech.edu. Archived from the original (PDF) on 7 September 2006.
- "asc antenna slides" (PDF). nt.hs-bremen.de. Archived from the original (PDF) on 26 September 2007.
- Fitzpatrick, Richard (2 February 2006). "The Hertzian dipole". Electromagnetic radiation. farside.ph.utexas.edu (notes for an intermediate level physics course). PHY 352K – Classical Electromagnetism. Austin, TX: University of Texas.
- The ARRL Antenna Book (21st ed.). Newington, CT: American Radio Relay League. 2007. ISBN 978-0-87259-987-1. ARRL books, catalog #6133.
- ARRL's Wire Antenna Classics. Vol. 1. Newington, CT: American Radio Relay League. 2005. ISBN 0-87259-707-5. ARRL books, catalog #7075. "A collection of the best articles from ARRL publications"
- Buchwald, J.Z. (c. 2002). Reflections on Hertz and the Hertzian Dipole (Report). MIT and Dibner Inst. Archived from the original on 26 May 2005.
