= Sloper antenna =

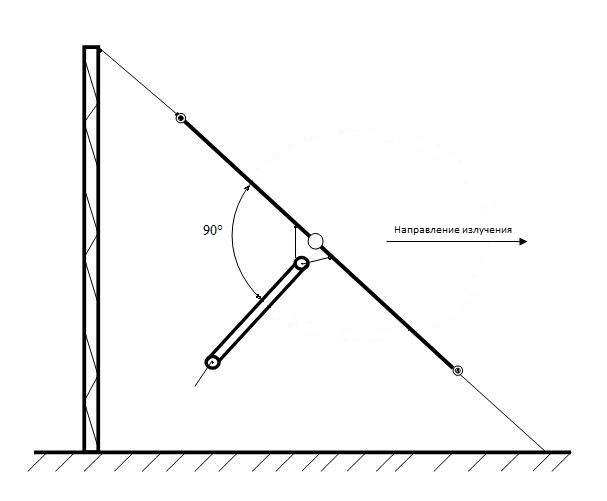
Sloped antenna

The sloper antenna is a slanted dipole antenna.

== Advantages ==
While horizontal dipoles required two large support masts, this antenna type only needs one large mast. It is therefore widely used by radio amateurs with limited space. In particular for low frequencies this antenna form is interesting. The angle of the slope is usually between 45°–60° and the lower end of the wire is at least 1/6 wavelength above the electrical ground.

A sloper is typically fed with a coaxial cable in the center, at the top of the center support mast. At least 1/4 of the wavelength of feedline must be at 90° angle to the antenna. It is also possible to feed the antenna asymmetrically. Due to the low-angle radiation pattern this antenna has, it performs well for long distance contacts (QSOs) (DX).
