= Inverted vee antenna =

Type of antenna

An inverted vee antenna is a type of antenna similar to a horizontal dipole, but with the two sides bent down towards the ground, typically creating a 120- or 90-degree angle between the dipole legs. It is typically used in areas of limited space as it can significantly reduce the ground foot print of the antenna without significantly impacting performance. Viewed from the side, it looks like the English letter "V" turned upside down, hence the name. Inverted vee antennas are commonly used by amateur radio stations, and can be used aboard sailing vessels requiring better HF performance than available with a short whip antenna. Inverted vee antennas are horizontally polarized and have a similar pattern compared to a traditional horizontal dipole.

Typical amateur radio inverted vee installed on roof. This multiband antenna allows transmissions on the 40/20/15/10 meter bands. Center point is held up with masting and ends are secured to roof. Two VHF verticals are also shown.

== Use ==
Typically, the inverted vee antenna requires only a single, tall support at the center, and the ends can be insulated and secured to anchors near ground level or near the roof if mounted on a house. This simplified arrangement has several advantages, including a shorter ground distance between the ends. For example, a dipole antenna for the 80 meter band requires a ground length of about 140 feet (43 m) from end to end. An inverted vee with a 40-foot (12 m) apex elevation requires only 115 feet (35 m) of ground length. For radio amateurs living on small parcels of property, such savings can make it possible to use the lower frequency amateur bands.

== Properties ==
In theory, the gain of an inverted vee is similar to that of a dipole at the same elevation because most of the radiation is from the high-current portion of the antenna, which is near the center. Since the center of both antennas are the same height, there is little difference in performance. Antenna modeling software bears this out for free-space models, predicting maximum gain of 2.15 dBi for the dipole and 1.9 dBi for the inverted vee.

However, in practice, ground proximity and ground conductivity as well as end effects reduce the efficiency of the inverted vee considerably compared to the dipole: In the 40-foot example above, considering a useful take-off angle of 40 degrees above the horizon, the inverted vee produces a maximum gain of 1 dBi in a circular pattern, whereas the dipole produces an oval pattern ranging from 6 dBi toward the sides down to 1.2 dBi toward the ends.

Elevating the antennas higher above ground somewhat resolves the disparity, but considering the practical, legal and financial limits which influence most antenna installations, the inverted vee will be observably inferior in performance to a dipole by 2 to 4 dB. However, if space is limited, an inverted vee may permit operation on frequencies that would not be possible with a full-sized dipole.
