= Coaxial antenna =

Type of half-wave dipole antenna

A coaxial antenna (often known as a coaxial dipole) is a particular form of a half-wave dipole antenna, most often employed as a vertically polarized omnidirectional antenna.

== History ==
Arnold B. Bailey was granted the US patent 2,184,729 Antenna System on December 26, 1939, after filing in 1937 for a vertical antenna providing coaxial element sleeve structures.

Bonnie Crystal was granted the US patent 7,151,497 Coaxial Antenna System on December 19, 2006, after filing in 2003 for new types of coaxial antennas with reduced size providing efficient broadband, wideband and controlled bandwidths, using radiation by the outside of the coaxial elements.

== Configuration ==
In the most basic form, a quarter-wavelength section ($\lambda$/4) of coaxial cable is prepared such that the inner and outer conductors are separate but still attached to the remaining cable.

The outer (shield) conductor is connected to a quarter-wavelength conducting sleeve into which the cable is inserted, and the inner conductor protrudes vertically above the sleeve for a quarter-wavelength. Also, additional quarter-wavelength sections may be connected to the outer conductor to form a better ground plane.

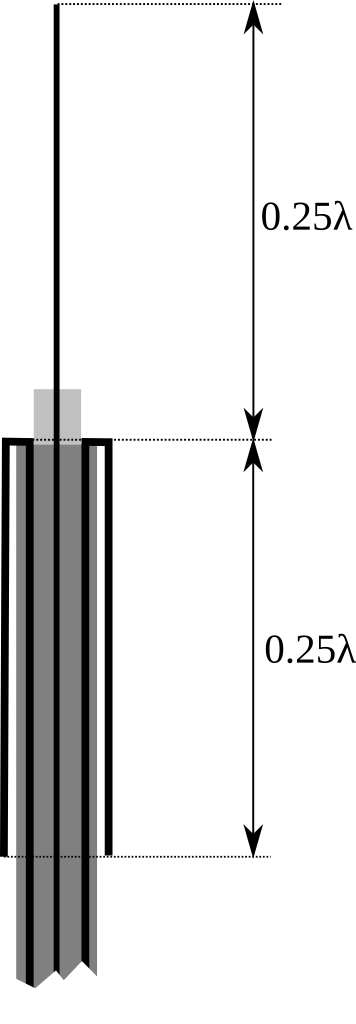
Coaxial antenna

== Bazooka Dipole coaxial antenna ==
Dipole antennas constructed using coaxial cables with shorted ends are often given the name "Bazooka" dipoles.

== See also ==
- Amateur radio
- Antenna (radio)
- Coaxial cable
- Dipole antenna
