= Hanna curve =

Curve that defines magnetic parameters of an inductor

An example of Hanna curve for a gapped inductor

A Hanna curve is a curve defining magnetic parameters of an inductor.

Hanna curves help in finding optimum working conditions (maximum energy stored in an air gap) for an inductor. Several parameters are taken into account, including: magnetic field or flux density level, size of an air gap, physical dimensions of the magnetic core, number of turns of the winding, etc.
