= Saturable reactor =

Type of variable reactance inductor

In concept, the alternating current through the lamp L can be controlled by the saturation of the iron core with the direct current, regulated by variable resistor R. B- battery, G – AC source.

A saturable reactor in electrical engineering is a special form of inductor where the magnetic core can be deliberately saturated by a direct electric current in a control winding. Once saturated, the inductance of the saturable reactor drops dramatically. This decreases inductive reactance and allows increased flow of the alternating current (AC).

== Design considerations ==
Saturable reactors provide a very simple means to remotely and proportionally control the AC through a load such as an incandescent lamp. Usually, DC in the order of milliamperes controls AC in the order of amperes. As the magnetic core saturates, the current to load increases, and as the magnetic core desaturates, the current to load decreases.

The power windings, the control winding, and the core are arranged so that the control winding is well isolated from the AC power. The AC power windings are also usually configured so that they self-cancel any AC voltage that might otherwise be induced in the control winding.

Because the required inductance to achieve dimming varies with the size of the load, saturable reactors often have multiple taps, allowing a small inductance to be used with a large load or a larger inductance to be used with a smaller load. In this way, the required magnitude of the control current can be kept roughly constant, no matter what the load is.

== Obsolete technology ==
Saturable reactors designed for mains (power-line) frequency are larger, heavier, and more expensive than electronic power controllers developed after the introduction of semiconductor electronic components, and have largely been replaced by thyristor dimmers using triacs or SCRs.

However, as of 2015, there has been renewed interest in using these devices for control of "smart grids" with multiple current tested installations in California, as well as the United Kingdom.

== See also ==
- Magnetic amplifier – A type of parametric amplifier
- Constant voltage transformer – Type of saturating transformer used as a voltage regulator.
- Transductor – Type of magnetic amplifier
