= Printed circuit board milling =

Process of creating circuit boards

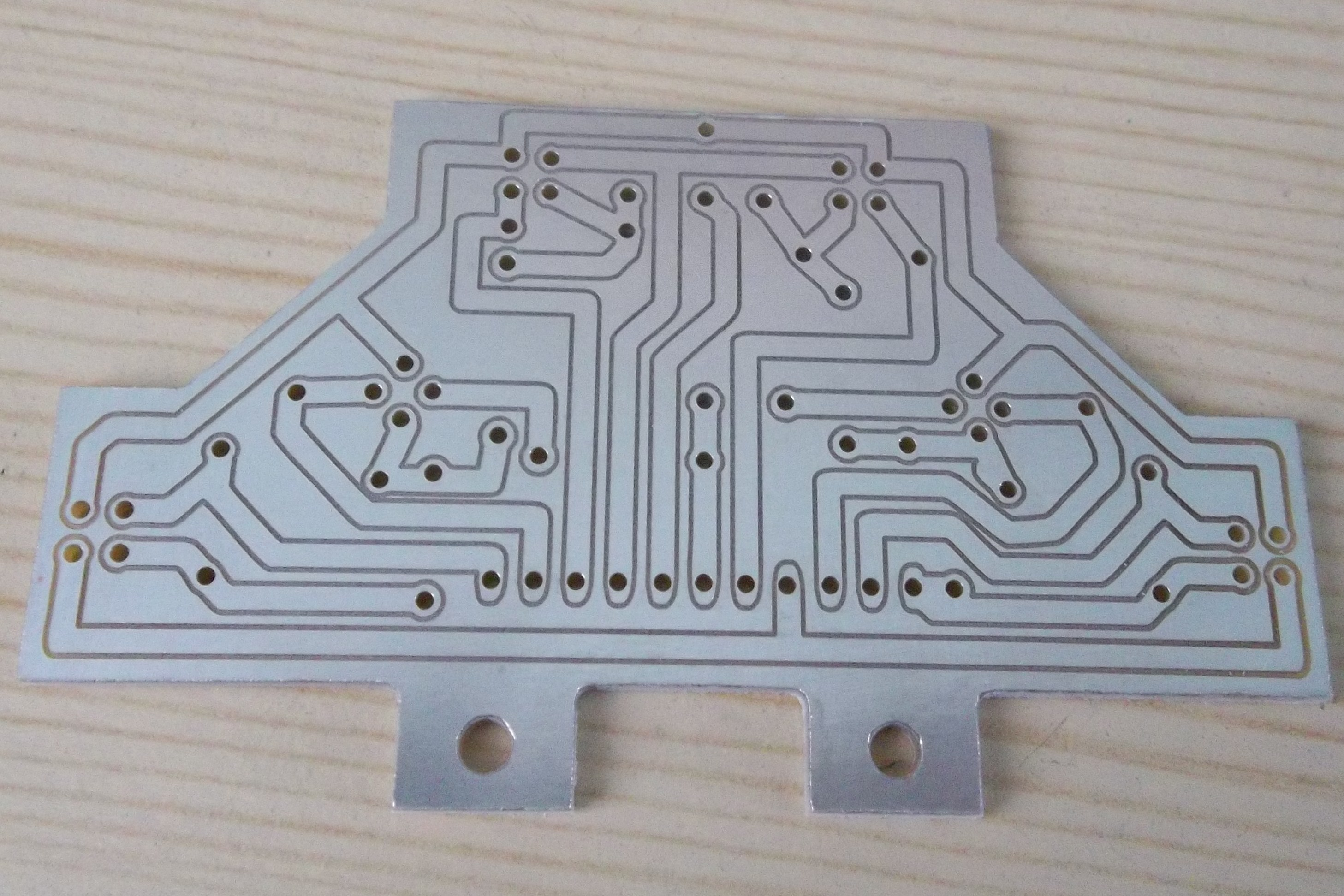
A milled printed circuit board

Printed circuit board milling (also: isolation milling) is the milling process used for removing areas of copper from a sheet of printed circuit board (PCB) material to recreate the pads, signal traces and structures according to patterns from a digital circuit board plan known as a layout file. Similar to the more common and well known chemical PCB etch process, the PCB milling process is subtractive: material is removed to create the electrical isolation and ground planes required. However, unlike the chemical etch process, PCB milling is typically a non-chemical process and as such it can be completed in a typical office or lab environment without exposure to hazardous chemicals. High quality circuit boards can be produced using either process. In the case of PCB milling, the quality of a circuit board is chiefly determined by the system's true, or weighted, milling accuracy and control as well as the condition (sharpness, temper) of the milling bits and their respective feed/rotational speeds. By contrast, in the chemical etch process, the quality of a circuit board depends on the accuracy and/or quality of the mask used to protect the copper from the chemicals and the state of the etching chemicals.

== Advantages ==
PCB milling has advantages for both prototyping and some special PCB designs. The biggest benefit is that one does not have to use chemicals to produce PCBs.

When creating a prototype, outsourcing a board takes time. An alternative is to make a PCB in-house. Using the wet process, in-house production presents problems with chemicals and disposing thereof. High-resolution boards using the wet process are hard to achieve and still, when done, one still has to drill and eventually cut out the PCB from the base material.

CNC machine prototyping can provide a fast-turnaround board production process without the need for wet processing. If a CNC machine is already used for drilling, this single machine could carry out both parts of the process, drilling and milling. A CNC machine is used to process drilling, milling and cutting.

Many boards that are simple for milling would be very difficult to process by wet etching and manual drilling afterward in a laboratory environment without using top-of-the-line systems that usually cost many times more than CNC milling machines.

In mass production, milling is unlikely to replace etching although the use of CNC is already standard practice for drilling the boards.

== Hardware ==
A PCB milling system is a single machine that can perform all of the required actions to create a prototype board, with the exception of inserting vias and through hole plating. Most of these machines require only a standard AC mains outlet and a shop-type vacuum cleaner for operation.

== Software ==
Software for milling PCBs is usually delivered by the CNC machine manufacturer. Most of the packages can be split in two main categories – raster and vector.

Software that produces tool paths using raster calculation method tends to have lower resolution of processing than the vector based software since it relies on the raster information it receives.

== Mechanical system ==
The mechanics behind a PCB milling machine are fairly straightforward and have their roots in CNC milling technology. A PCB milling system is similar to a miniature and highly accurate NC milling table. For machine control, positioning information and machine control commands are sent from the controlling software via a serial port or parallel port connection to the milling machine's on-board controller. The controller is then responsible for driving and monitoring the various positioning components which move the milling head and gantry and control the spindle speed. Spindle speeds can range from 30,000 RPM to 100,000 RPM depending on the milling system, with higher spindle speeds equating to better accuracy. Higher RPM is required as the tool diameter gets smaller. Typically this drive system comprises non-monitored stepper motors for the X/Y axis, an on-off non-monitored solenoid, pneumatic piston or lead screw for the Z-axis, and a DC motor control circuit for spindle speed, none of which provide positional feedback. More advanced systems provide a monitored stepper motor Z-axis drive for greater control during milling and drilling as well as more advanced RF spindle motor control circuits that provide better control over a wider range of speeds.

=== X and Y-axis control ===
For the X and Y-axis drive systems most PCB milling machines use stepper motors that drive a precision lead screw. The lead screw is in turn linked to the gantry or milling head by a special precision machined connection assembly. To maintain correct alignment during milling, the gantry or milling head's direction of travel is guided along using linear or dovetailed bearing(s). Most X/Y drive systems provide user control, via software, of the milling speed, which determines how fast the stepper motors drive their respective axes.

=== Z-axis control ===
Z-axis drive and control are handled in several ways. The first and most common is a simple solenoid that pushes against a spring. When the solenoid is energized it pushes the milling head down against a spring stop that limits the downward travel. The rate of descent as well as the amount of force exerted on the spring stop must be manually set by mechanically adjusting the position of the solenoid's plunger.

The second type of Z-axis control is through the use of a pneumatic cylinder and a software-driven gate valve. Due to the small cylinder size and the amount of air pressure used to drive it there is little range of control between the up and down stops. Both the solenoid and pneumatic system cannot position the head anywhere other than the endpoints, and are therefore useful for only simple 'up/down' milling tasks. The final type of Z-axis control uses a stepper motor that allows the milling head to be moved in small accurate steps up or down. Further, the speed of these steps can be adjusted to allow tool bits to be eased into the board material rather than hammered into it. The depth (number of steps required) as well as the downward/upward speed is under user control via the controlling software.

One of the major challenges with milling PCBs is handling variations in flatness. Since conventional etching techniques rely on optical masks that sit right on the copper layer they can conform to any slight bends in the material so all features are replicated faithfully.

When milling PCBs however, any minute height variations encountered when milling will cause conical bits to either sink deeper (creating a wider cut) or rise off the surface, leaving an uncut section. Before cutting some systems perform height mapping probes across the board to measure height variations and adjust the Z values in the G-code beforehand.

=== Tooling ===
PCBs may be machined with conventional endmills, conical d-bit cutters, and spade mills. D-bits and spade mills are cheap and as they have a small point allow the traces to be close together. Taylor's equation, Vc T^{n} = C, can predict tool life for a given surface speed.
