= W4BD Antenna =

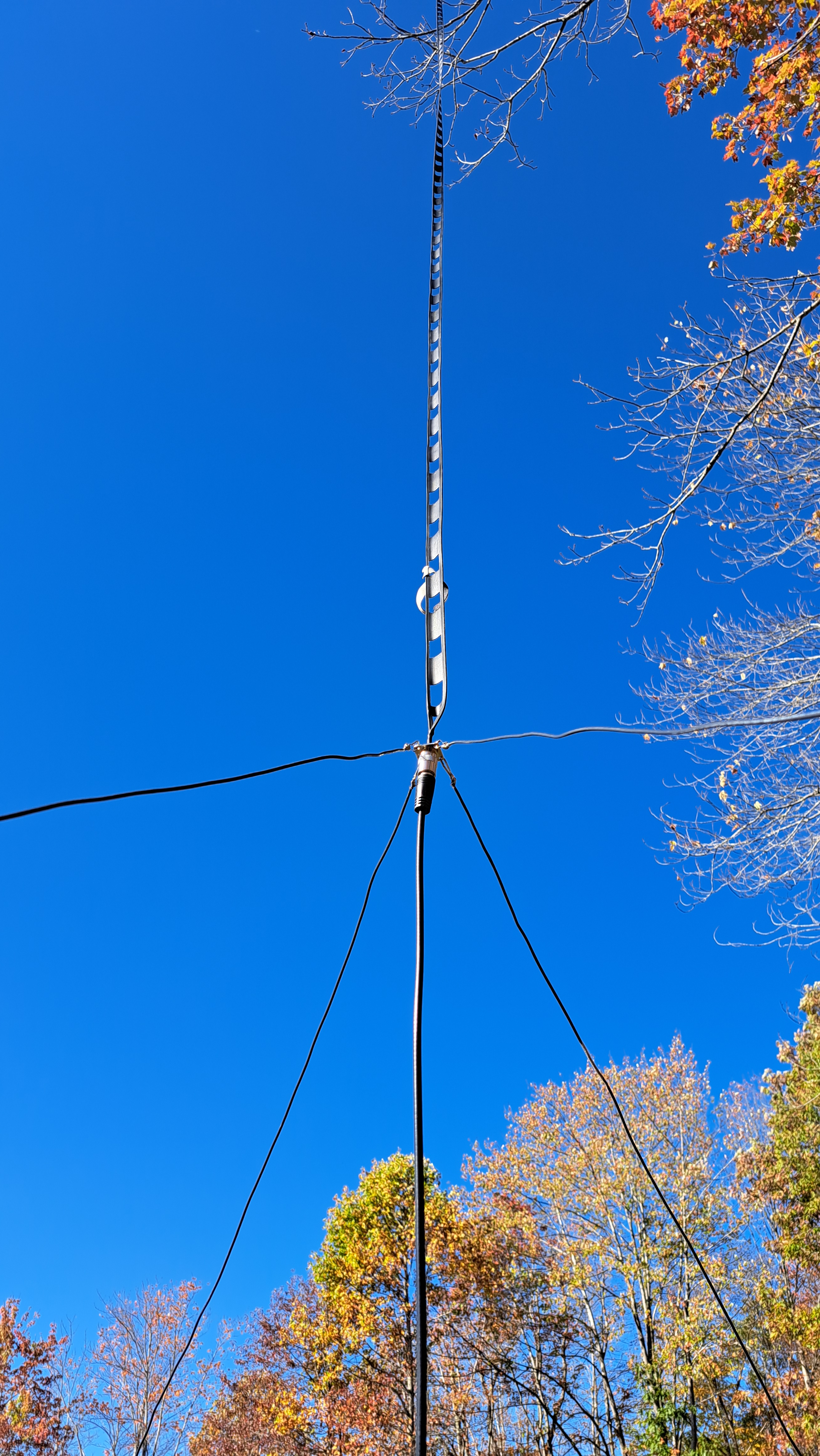
W4BD 4020 fan vertical antenna with radials and elevated feed point

The W4BD antenna is a specific type of fan vertical antenna for HF radio constructed from 450 ohm twin-lead cable (also commonly known as window line or ladder line). Based upon the same concept as a fan dipole antenna, a fan vertical antenna has multiple Radio frequency (RF) radiating elements each tuned to specific HF frequency bands. The W4BD antenna is multi-banded, meaning it is resonant on multiple bands, due to having these two distinct radiating elements. The most popular W4BD antenna used for portable radio use is the W4BD 4020 fan vertical and is functional on 15m, 20m and 40m bands and is approximately 35 feet in length overall.

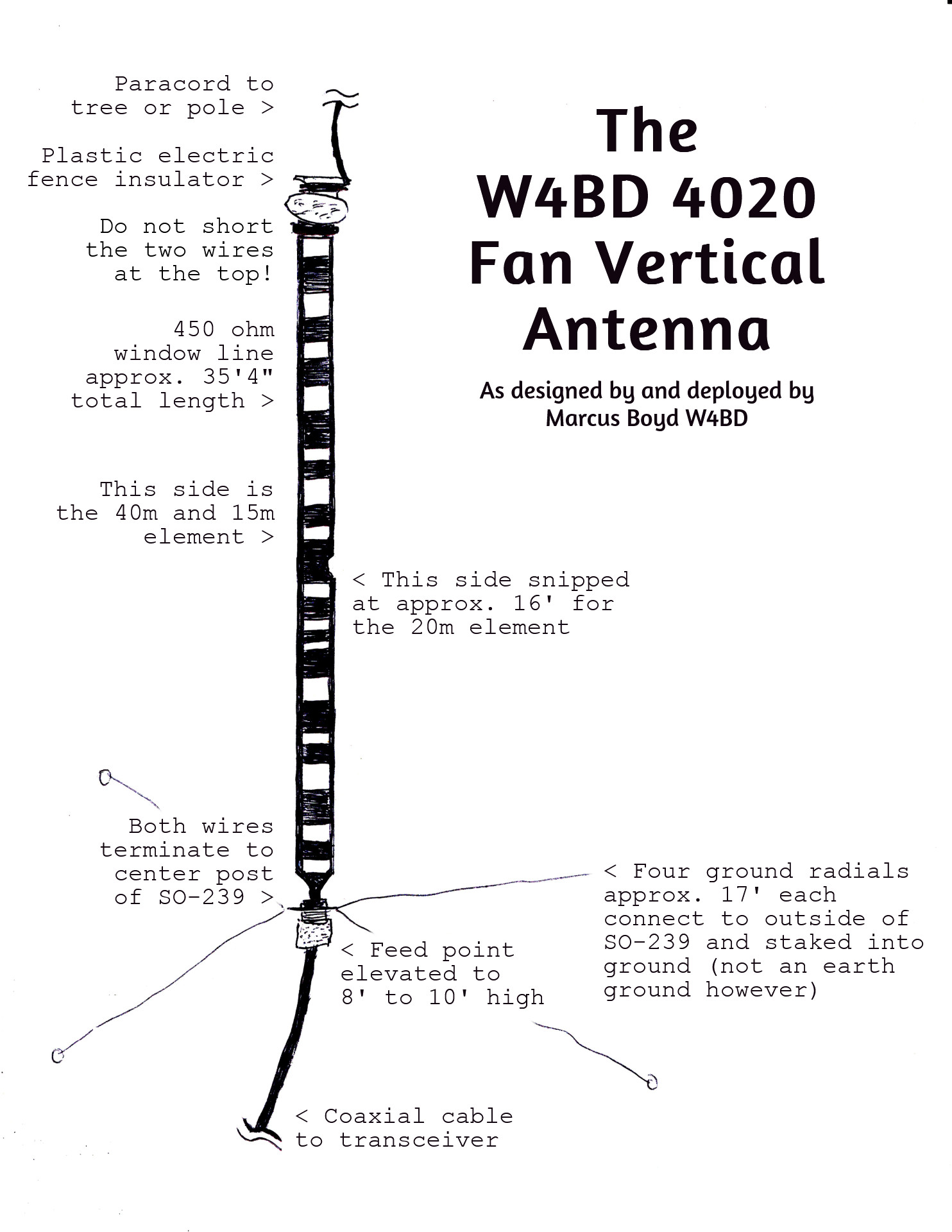
Sketch showing the construction of the W4BD 4020 fan vertical antenna

Once constructed, one of the two wires of the 450 ohm twin lead is resonant as a quarter wave vertical on the lower band. The other wire is cut shorter to tune as a quarter wave vertical on a higher frequency band. Like any other fan vertical antenna, both elements connect to the center post of the antenna coaxial cable connector. Ground radials are often then be connected to the outer post of the coaxial connector to complement the radiating elements.

The W4BD antenna is named after amateur radio operator W4BD, Marcus Boyd, who designed this type of fan vertical by using a scrap piece of twin-lead cable for use in Parks on the Air activations, Field Day contesting and general portable radio events.
