= Stamped circuit board =

Method to connect and mechanically support electronic components for small circuits

A stamped circuit board (SCB) is used to mechanically support and electrically connect electronic components using conductive pathways, tracks or traces etched from copper sheets laminated onto a non-conductive substrate. This technology is used for small circuits, for instance in the production of LEDs.

Similar to printed circuit boards this layer structure may comprise glass-fibre reinforced epoxy resin and copper. Basically, in the case of LED substrates three variations are possible:

1. the PCB (printed circuit board),
2. plastic-injection molding and
3. the SCB.

Using the SCB technology it is possible to structure and laminate the most widely differing material combinations in a reel-to-reel production process. As the layers are structured separately, improved design concepts are able to be implemented. Consequently, a far better and quicker heat dissipation from within the chip is achieved.

== Production ==
Both the plastic and the metal are initially processed on separate reels, .i.e. in accordance with the requirements the materials are individually structured by stamping (“brought into form“) and then merged.

== Advantages ==
The engineering respectively choice of substrates actually comes down to the particular application, module design/substrate assembly, material and thickness of the material involved.

Taking these parameters it is possible to attain a good thermal management by using SCB technology, because rapid heat dissipation from beneath the chip means a longer service life for the system. Furthermore, SCB technology allows the material to be chosen to correspond to the pertinent requirements and then to optimize the design to arrive at a “perfect fit”.
