= Image antenna =

Due to its image (b) in the ground plane, a monopole antenna (a) has the same radiation pattern over perfect ground as a dipole antenna (c) in free space with twice the voltage

In telecommunications and antenna design, an image antenna is an electrical mirror-image of an antenna element formed by the radio waves reflecting from a conductive surface called a ground plane, such as the surface of the earth. It is used as a geometrical technique in calculating the radiation pattern of the antenna.

When a radio antenna is mounted near a conductive surface such as the Earth or a flat metal plate or screen, the radio waves directed toward the surface reflect off it. The radiation received at a distant point is the sum of two contributions: the waves that travel directly from the antenna to the point, and the waves that reach the point after reflecting off the ground plane. Because of the reflection, these second waves appear to come from a second antenna behind the plane, just as a visible object in front of a flat mirror forms a virtual image that seems to lie behind the mirror. The radiation pattern of the antenna is exactly the same as it would be if the ground plane were replaced by a mirror image of the antenna, located an equal distance behind the plane. This second apparent source of radio waves is the image antenna.

The image antenna is used in calculating electric field vectors, magnetic field vectors, and electromagnetic fields emanating from the real antenna, particularly in the vicinity of the antenna and along the ground. Each charge and current in the real antenna has its counterpart in the image, and may also be considered as a source of radiation.

To form an image of the antenna, the ground plane need not be grounded to the Earth. Many antenna types, such as reflective array antennas, use flat surfaces of metal or metal screen to reflect radio waves from the antenna elements, and these can be analyzed using image antennas. If there is more than one reflective surface in the antenna, as in a corner reflector antenna, each surface forms its own image of the antenna elements. In order to form an image, the ground plane surface must generally have dimensions of at least a quarter-wavelength of the radio waves used.

== See also ==
- Method of image charges

This article incorporates public domain material from Federal Standard 1037C. General Services Administration. Archived from the original on 2022-01-22. (in support of MIL-STD-188).
