= D bit cutter =

Specialty cutting tool

A D bit cutter is a specialty bit in the shape of a "D" when looking from above. Often used to make precision holes using a lathe.

This type of drill was first used in the early manufacture of muskets and other artifacts requiring a long straight holes in the days before modern accurate machines were available."
