= Ground plane =

Electrically conductive surface, usually connected to electrical ground

In electrical engineering, a ground plane is an electrically conductive surface, usually connected to electrical ground. Ground planes are typically made of copper or aluminum, and they are often located on the bottom of printed circuit boards (PCBs).

The term has two different meanings in separate areas of electrical engineering.

- In antenna theory, a ground plane is a conducting surface large in comparison to the wavelength, such as the Earth, which is connected to the transmitter's ground wire and serves as a reflecting surface for radio waves.
- In printed circuit boards, a ground plane is a large area of copper foil on the board which is connected to the power supply ground terminal and serves as a return path for current from different components on the board.

== Radio antenna theory ==
For a monopole antenna (a), the Earth acts as a ground plane to reflect radio waves directed downwards, making them seem to come from a virtual image antenna (b).

In Telecommunications, a ground plane is a flat or nearly flat horizontal conducting surface that serves as part of an antenna, to reflect the radio waves from the other antenna elements. In monopole antennas the ground plane is connected to one side of the antenna feedline, usually the shield conductor of a coaxial cable, and the other side is connected to the monopole element itself. Ground plane shape and size play major roles in determining its radiation characteristics including gain.

To function as a ground plane, the conducting surface must be at least a quarter of the wavelength ( 1 /4 λ) of the radio waves in radius. In lower frequency antennas, such as the mast radiators used for broadcast antennas, the Earth itself (or a body of water such as a salt marsh or ocean) is used as a ground plane. For higher frequency antennas, in the VHF or UHF range, the ground plane can be smaller, and metal disks, screens and wires are used as ground planes. At upper VHF and UHF, the metal skin of a car or aircraft can serve as a ground plane for whip antennas projecting from it. In microstrip antennas and printed monopole antennas an area of copper foil on the opposite side of a printed circuit board serves as a ground plane. The ground plane does not need to be a continuous surface. In the ground plane antenna style whip antenna, the plane consists of several wires 1 /4 λ long radiating from the base of a quarter-wave whip antenna.

The radio waves from an antenna element that reflect off a ground plane appear to come from a mirror image of the antenna located on the other side of the ground plane. In a monopole antenna, the radiation pattern of the monopole plus the virtual image antenna make it appear as a two-element center-fed dipole antenna. So a monopole mounted over an ideal ground plane has a radiation pattern identical to a dipole antenna. The feedline from the transmitter or receiver is connected between the bottom end of the monopole element and the ground plane. The ground plane must have good conductivity; any resistance in the ground plane is in series with the antenna and serves to dissipate power from the transmitter.

Antennas usually need ground planes as they serves as a stabilizing factor for the signal, ensuring that antennas have a consistent baseline from which to transmit and receive information. It also helps create a specific radiation pattern by reflecting radio waves, ensuring that the antenna radiates efficiently. There are also some cases that ground planes can improve the overall performance of the antenna by ensuring better signal propagation.

== Printed circuit boards ==
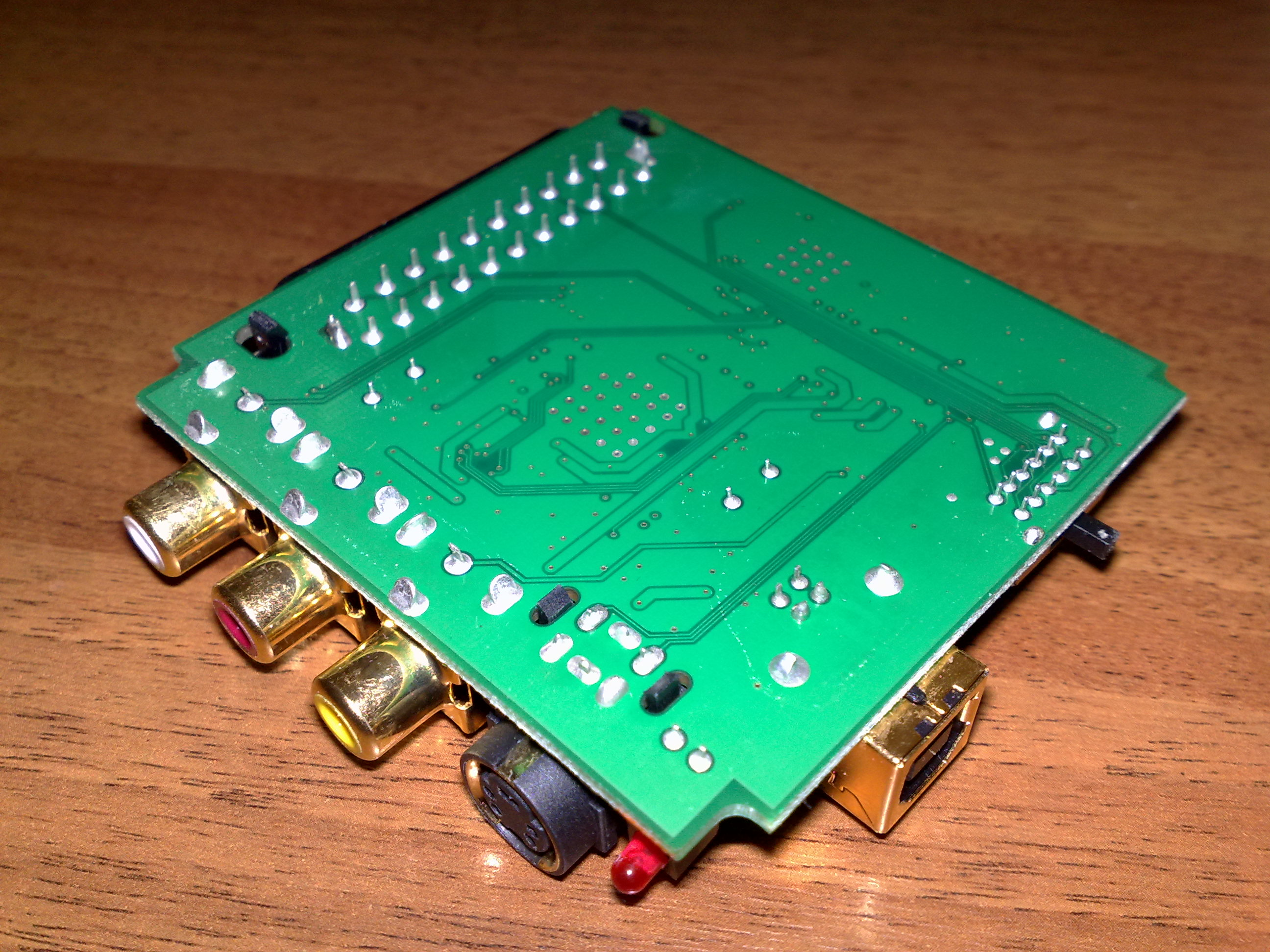
The large light-green areas on this printed circuit board are the ground plane

A ground plane on a printed circuit board (PCB) is a large area or layer of copper foil connected to the circuit's ground point, usually one terminal of the power supply. It serves as the return path for current from many different components.

A ground plane is often made as large as possible, covering most of the area of the PCB which is not occupied by circuit traces. In multilayer PCBs, it is often a separate layer covering the entire board. This serves to make circuit layout easier, allowing the designer to ground any component without having to run additional traces; component leads needing grounding are routed directly through a hole in the board to the ground plane on another layer. The large area of copper also conducts the large return currents from many components without significant voltage drops, ensuring that the ground connection of all the components are at the same reference potential.

In digital and radio frequency PCBs, the major reason for using large ground planes is to reduce electrical noise and interference through ground loops and to prevent crosstalk between adjacent circuit traces. When digital circuits switch state, large current pulses flow from the active devices (transistors or integrated circuits) through the ground circuit. If the power supply and ground traces have significant impedance, the voltage drop across them may create noise voltage pulses that disturb other parts of the circuit (ground bounce). The large conducting area of the ground plane has much lower impedance than a circuit trace, so the current pulses cause less disturbance.

In addition, a ground plane under printed circuit traces can reduce crosstalk between adjacent traces. When two traces run parallel, an electrical signal in one can be coupled into the other through electromagnetic induction by magnetic field lines from one linking the other; this is called crosstalk. When a ground plane layer is present underneath, it forms a transmission line with the trace. The oppositely-directed return currents flow through the ground plane directly beneath the trace. This confines most of the electromagnetic fields to the area near the trace and consequently reduces crosstalk.

A power plane is often used in addition to a ground plane in a multilayer circuit board, to distribute DC power to the active devices. The two facing areas of copper create a large parallel plate decoupling capacitor that prevents noise from being coupled from one circuit to another through the power supply.

Ground planes are sometimes split and then connected by a thin trace. This allows the separation of analog and digital sections of a board or the inputs and outputs of amplifiers. The thin trace has low enough impedance to keep the two sides very close to the same potential while keeping the ground currents of one side from coupling into the other side, causing ground loop.

== See also ==
- Antenna (radio) § Effect of ground
- Counterpoise (ground system)
- Power plane
- Microstrip and stripline
- Printed circuit board milling
- Copper pour
- Salisbury screen
- Image antenna
