= Signal trace =

In electronics, a signal trace or circuit trace on a printed circuit board (PCB) or integrated circuit (IC) is the equivalent of a wire for conducting signals. Each trace consists of a flat, narrow part of the copper foil that remains after etching. Signal traces are usually narrower than power or ground traces because the current carrying requirements are usually much less.

== See also ==
- Ground plane
- Stripline
- Microstrip
