= Monopole antenna =

Class of radio antenna

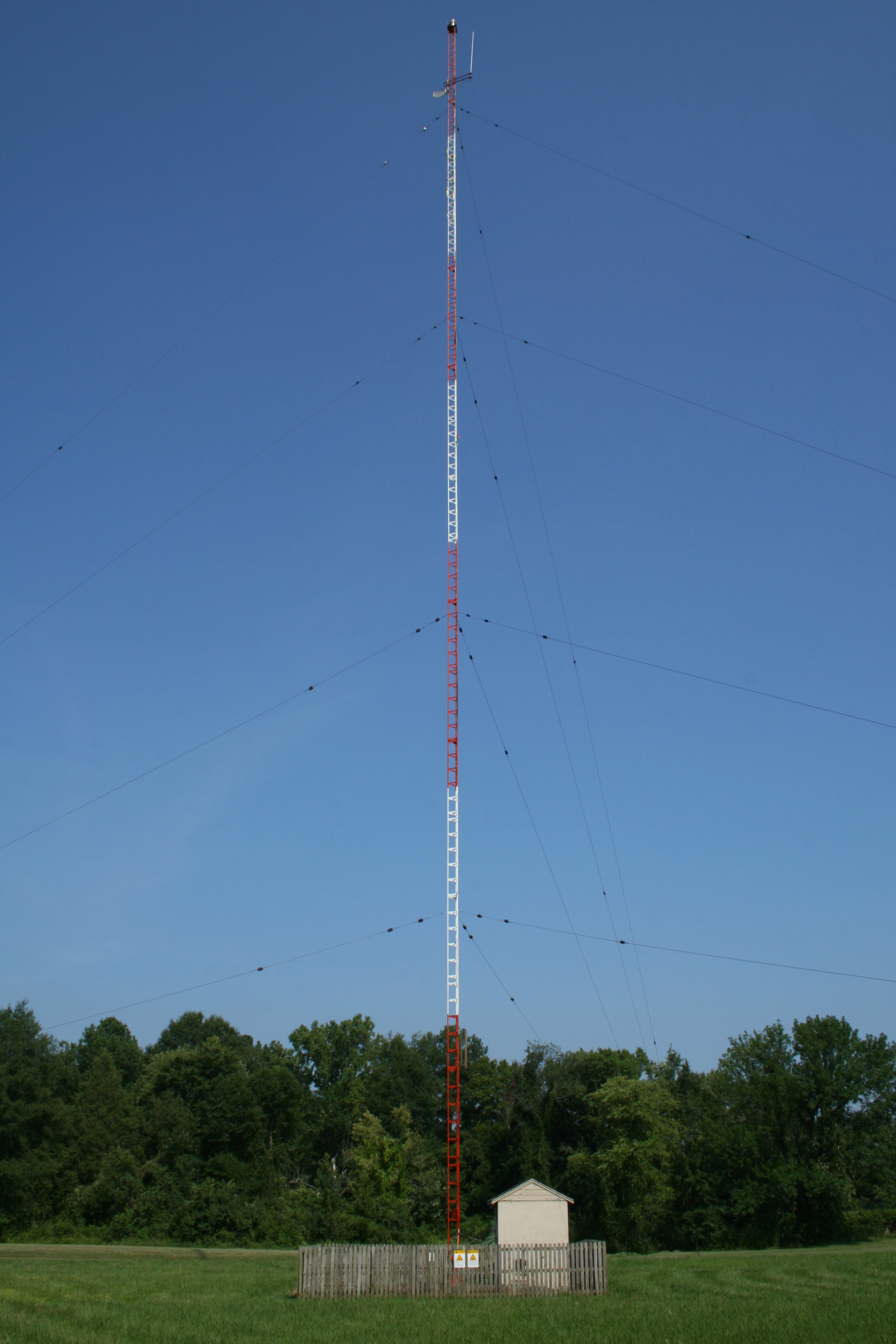
A typical mast radiator monopole antenna of an AM radio station in Chapel Hill, North Carolina. The metal mast itself is connected to the transmitter and radiates the radio waves. It is mounted on a ceramic insulator to isolate it from the ground. The other terminal of the transmitter is connected to a radial ground system consisting of cables buried under the field.

A monopole antenna is a class of radio antenna consisting of a straight rod-shaped conductor, often mounted perpendicularly over some type of conductive surface, called a ground plane. The current from the transmitter is applied, or for receiving antennas the output signal voltage to the receiver is taken, between the monopole and the ground plane. One side of the feedline to the transmitter or receiver is connected to the lower end of the monopole element, and the other side is connected to the ground plane, which may be the Earth. This contrasts with a dipole antenna which consists of two identical rod conductors, with the current from the transmitter applied between the two halves of the antenna. The monopole antenna is related mathematically to the dipole. The vertical monopole is an omnidirectional antenna with a low gain of 2 - 5 dBi, and radiates most of its power in horizontal directions or low elevation angles. Common types of monopole antenna are the whip, rubber ducky, umbrella, inverted-L and T-antenna, inverted-F, folded unipole antenna, mast radiator, and ground plane antennas.

The monopole is usually used as a resonant antenna; the rod functions as an open resonator for radio waves, oscillating with standing waves of voltage and current along its length. Therefore the length of the antenna is determined by the wavelength of the radio waves it is used with. The most common form is the quarter-wave monopole, in which the antenna is approximately one quarter of the wavelength of the radio waves. It is said to be the most widely used antenna in the world. Monopoles shorter than one-quarter wavelength, called electrically short monopoles, are also widely used since they are more compact. Monopoles five-eights (5/8 = 0.625) of a wavelength long are also common, because at this length a monopole radiates a maximum amount of its power in horizontal directions. A capacitively loaded or top-loaded monopole is a monopole antenna with horizontal conductors such as wires or screens insulated from ground attached to the top of the monopole element, to increase radiated power. Large top-loaded monopoles, the T and inverted L antennas and umbrella antenna are used as transmitting antennas at longer wavelengths, in the LF and VLF bands.

The monopole antenna was invented in 1895 by radio pioneer Guglielmo Marconi; for this reason it is also called the Marconi antenna although Alexander Popov independently invented it at about the same time.

== Types and uses ==
Due to their omnidirectional radiation pattern, vertical monopole antennas are commonly used in terrestrial radio communication systems in which the direction to the transmitter or receiver is unknown or constantly changing, such as radio broadcasting, mobile two-way radios, beacons, and wireless devices like cellphones and Wi-Fi networks, because they radiate equal radio power in all horizontal directions but little power up into the sky where it would be wasted. The quarter-wave monopole is the smallest antenna that is resonant, making it an efficient radiator; it is said to be the most widely used antenna in the world.

Lower frequency monopole antennas

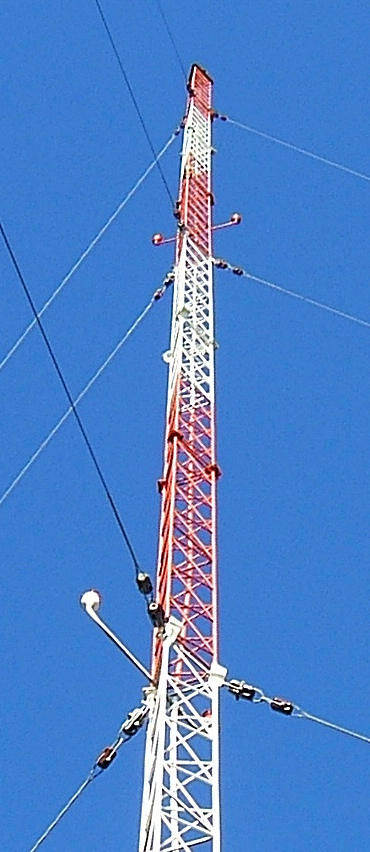
200 foot mast radiator of AM radio station, USA

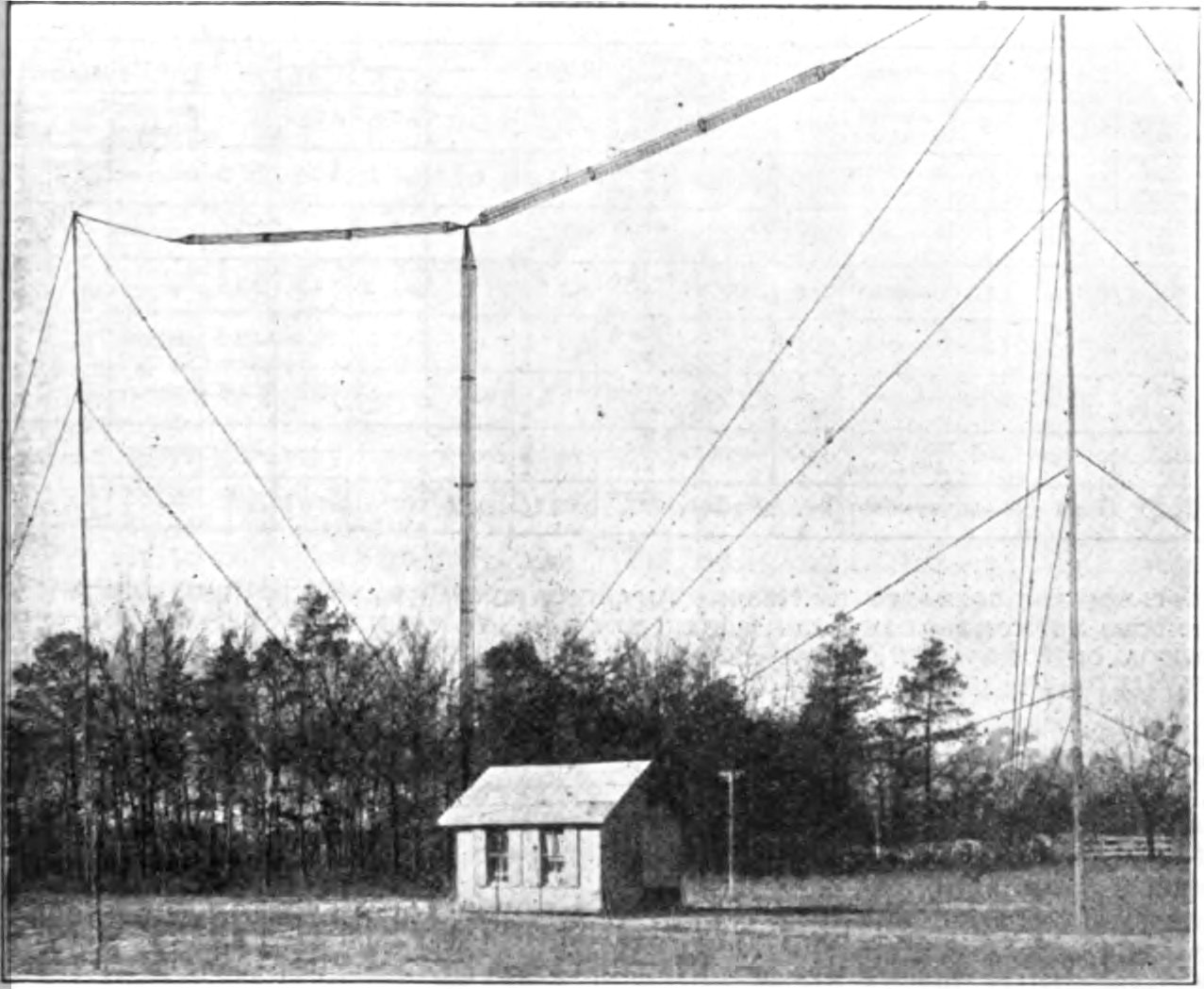
Amateur radio cage T antenna at Riverhead, New York, used to communicate with Europe at frequency of 1.5 MHz, 1922

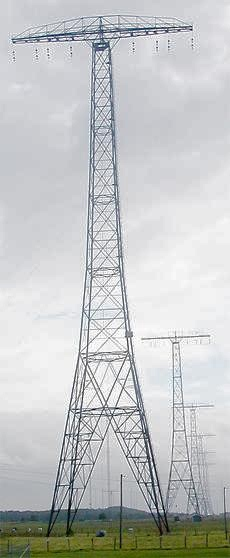
VLF flattop antenna at Grimeton Radio Station, Sweden

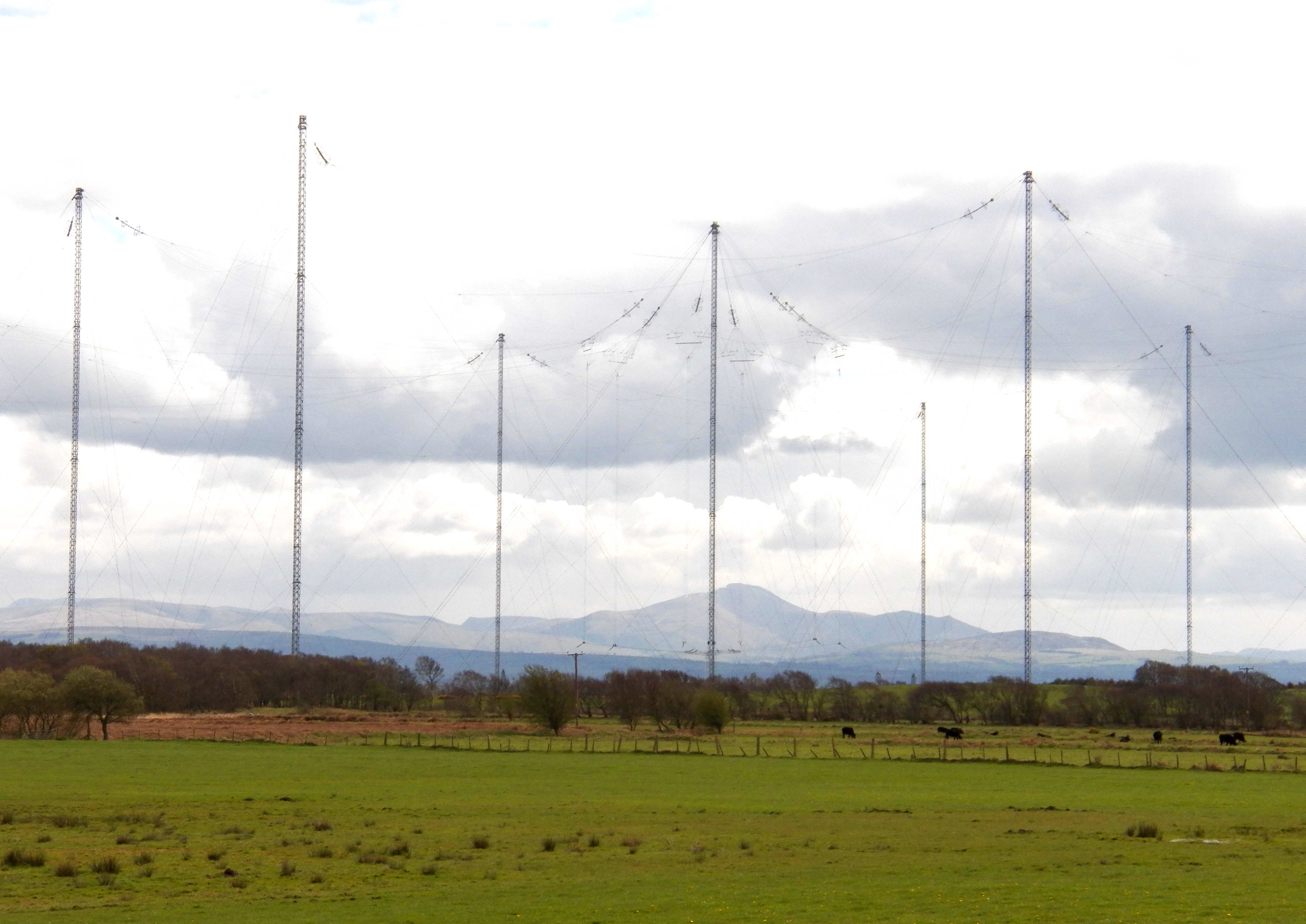
Trideco umbrella antenna of the VLF transmitter at Anthorn military radio station, UK, transmitting at 19.6 kHz

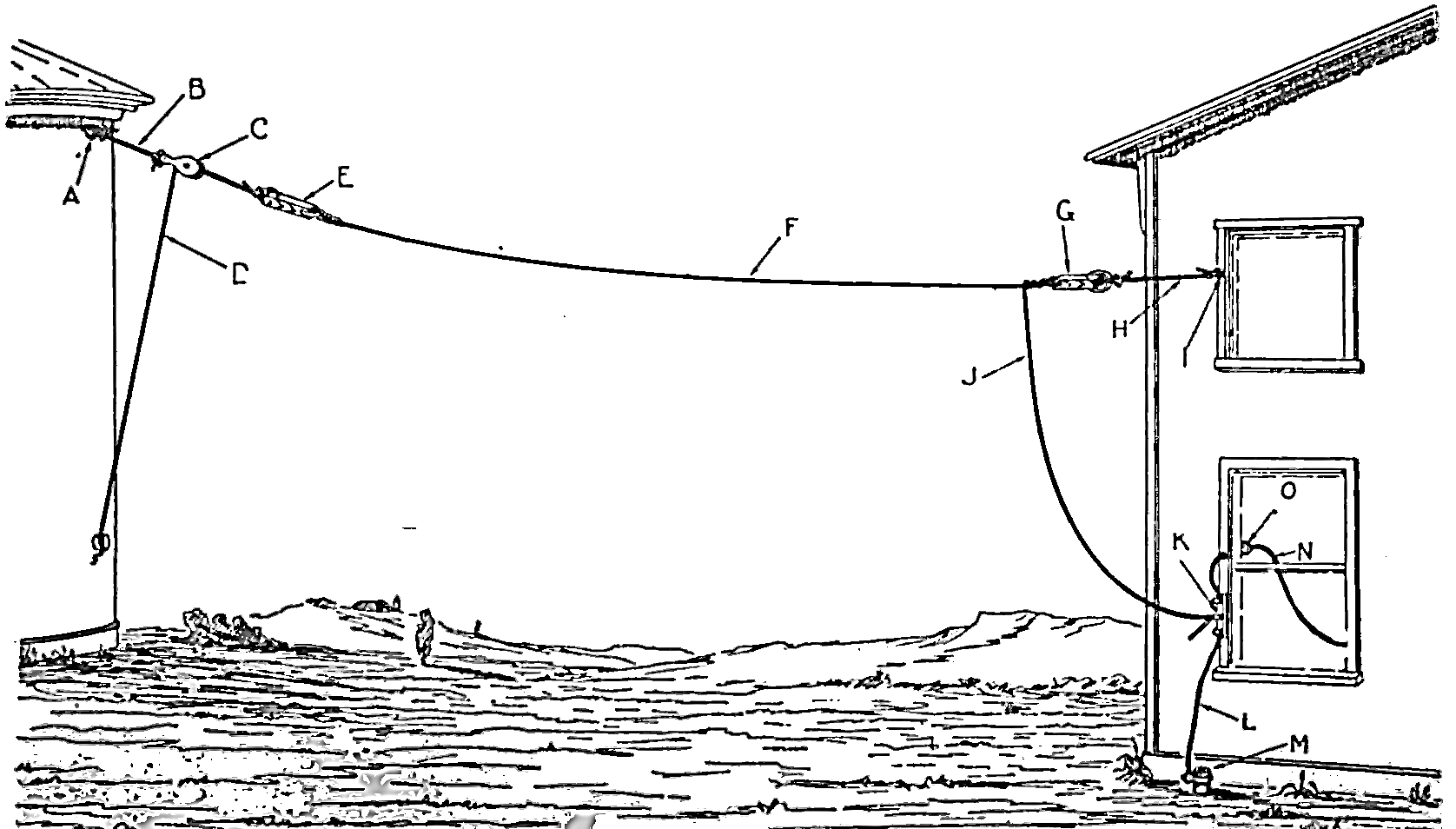
Amateur inverted-L antenna for shortwave reception, showing construction

Large monopoles are the main transmitting antennas used in the lower frequencies below 3 MHz, the MF, LF, and VLF bands, because the radio propagation mode used in these bands, ground waves, requires a vertically polarized antenna with good horizontal radiation characteristics. At these frequencies, the Earth itself is used as the antenna's ground plane. The most common antenna is the mast radiator, a vertical mast mounted on the ground but insulated from it electrically. ranging from about one-sixth to five-eighths wavelengths tall. One side of the feedline from the transmitter is connected to the conductive metal mast which serves as the radiating element, and the other to an Earth ground connection consisting of a radial network of buried wires stretching outward from a terminal at the base of the antenna. This design is used for AM radio broadcasting antennas in the MF and LF bands. Another variant is the folded unipole antenna. At lower frequencies in the LF and VLF band, the tallest antenna masts that can be practically constructed are electrically short, significantly shorter than one-quarter wavelength. Simple monopoles this short are inefficient due to their very low radiation resistance, so to increase efficiency and radiated power, capacitively top-loaded monopoles such as the inverted-L, T antenna and umbrella antenna are used.

In the shortwave bands variations such as the folded monopole, J-pole antenna, and normal mode helical are used.

Higher frequency monopole antennas

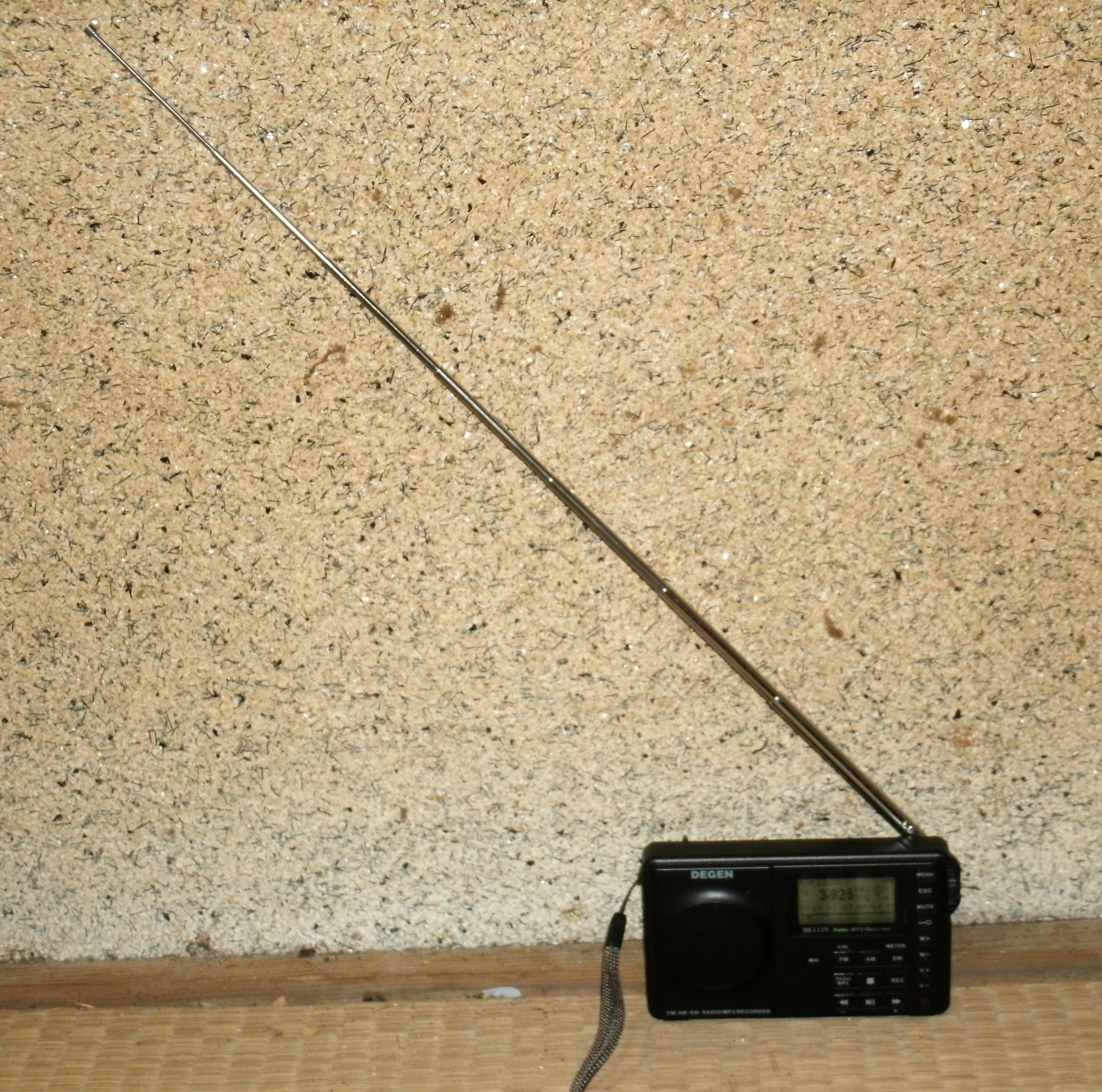
Retractable quarter-wave whip antenna for FM reception on a portable radio, 88 - 108 MHz

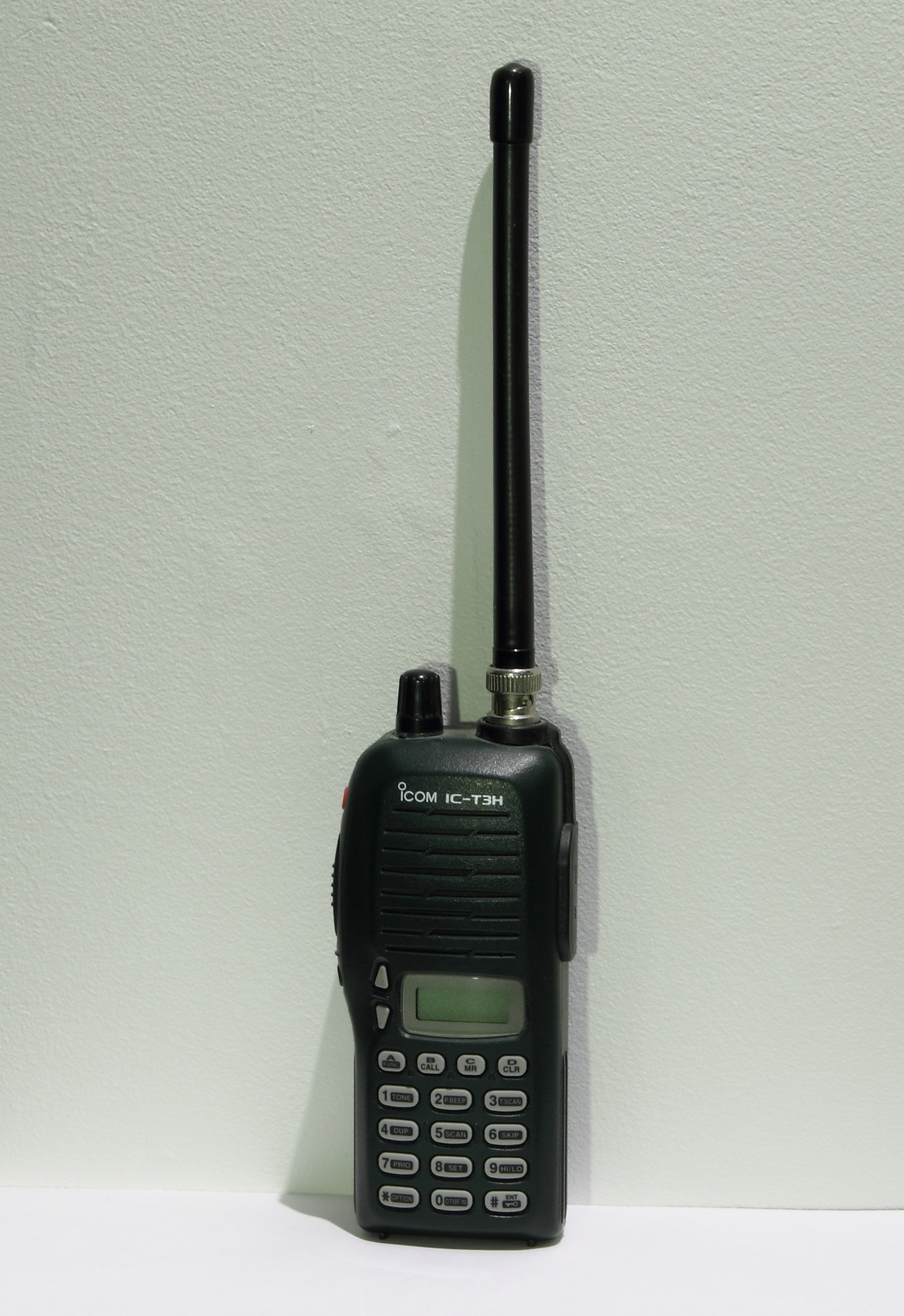
Rubber ducky antenna on walkie-talkie, 144 MHz

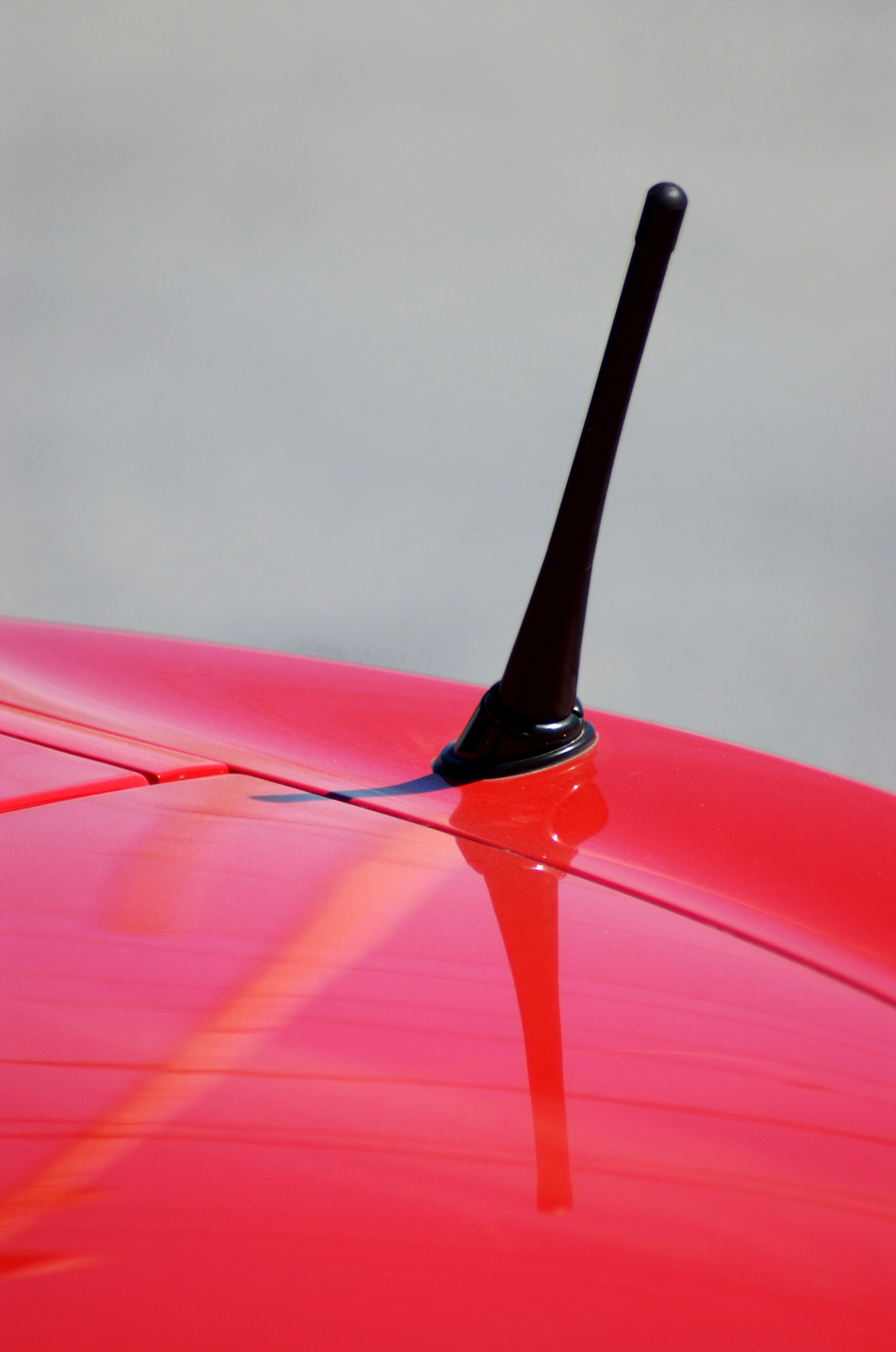
Cell phone UHF whip antenna on car

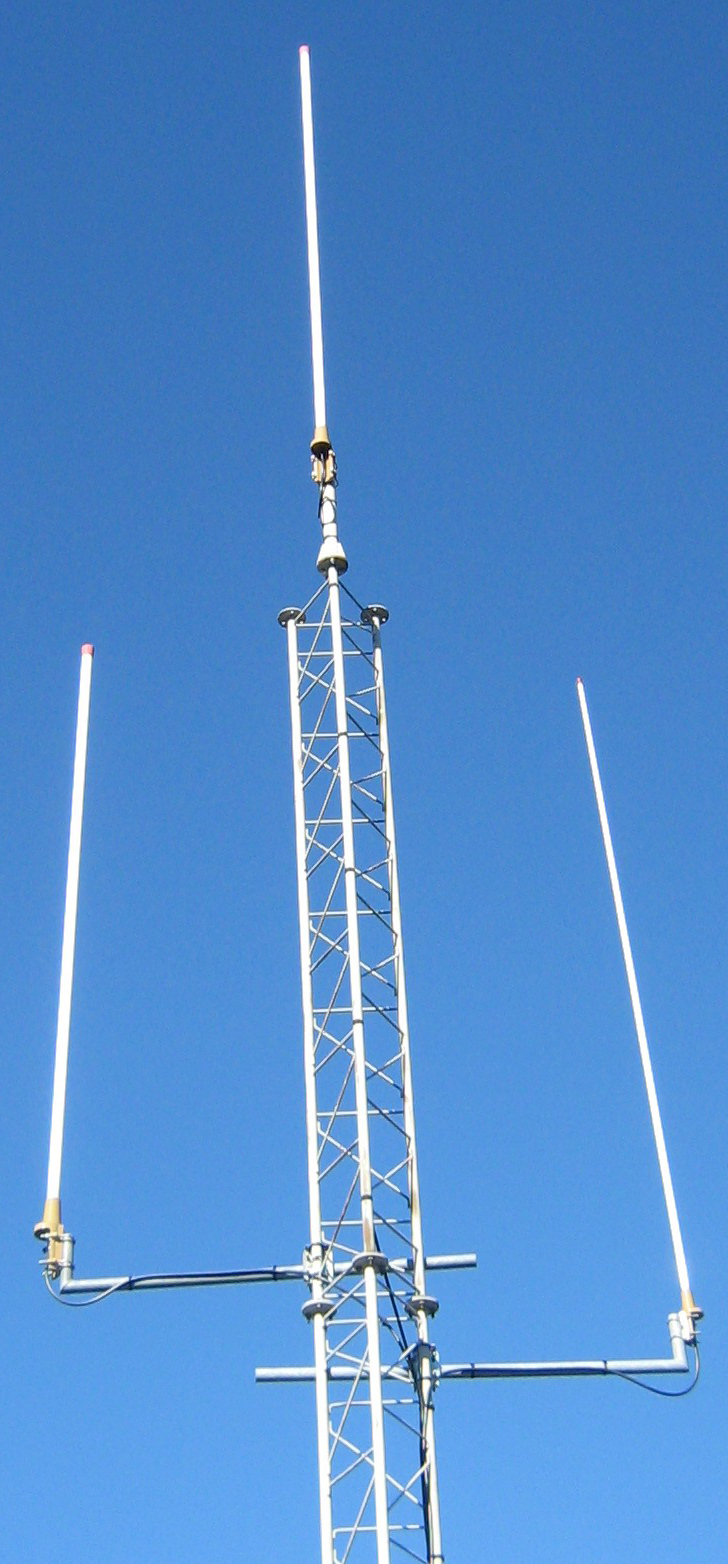
3 fiberglass half-wave whip antennas

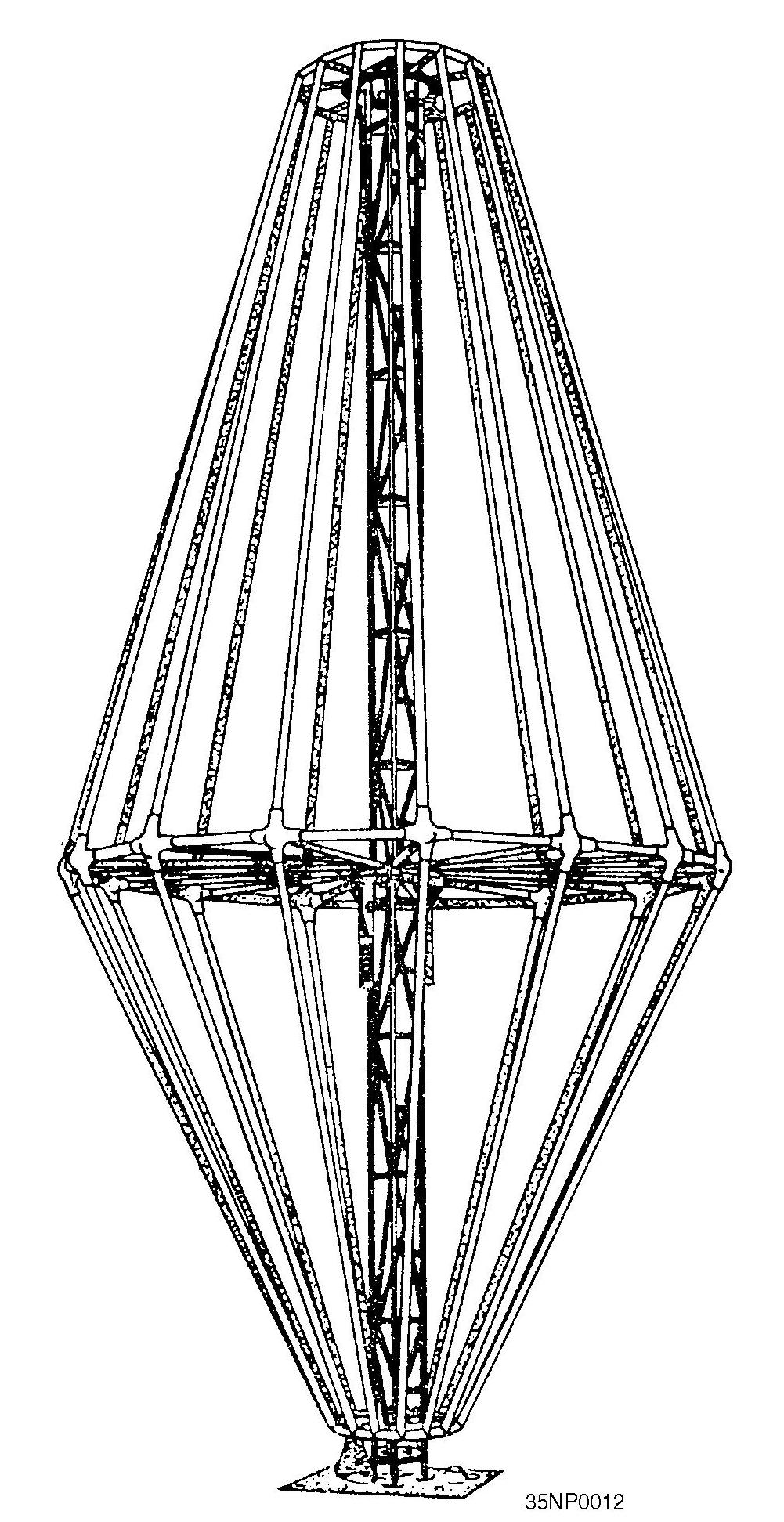
US Navy broadband conical monopole antenna

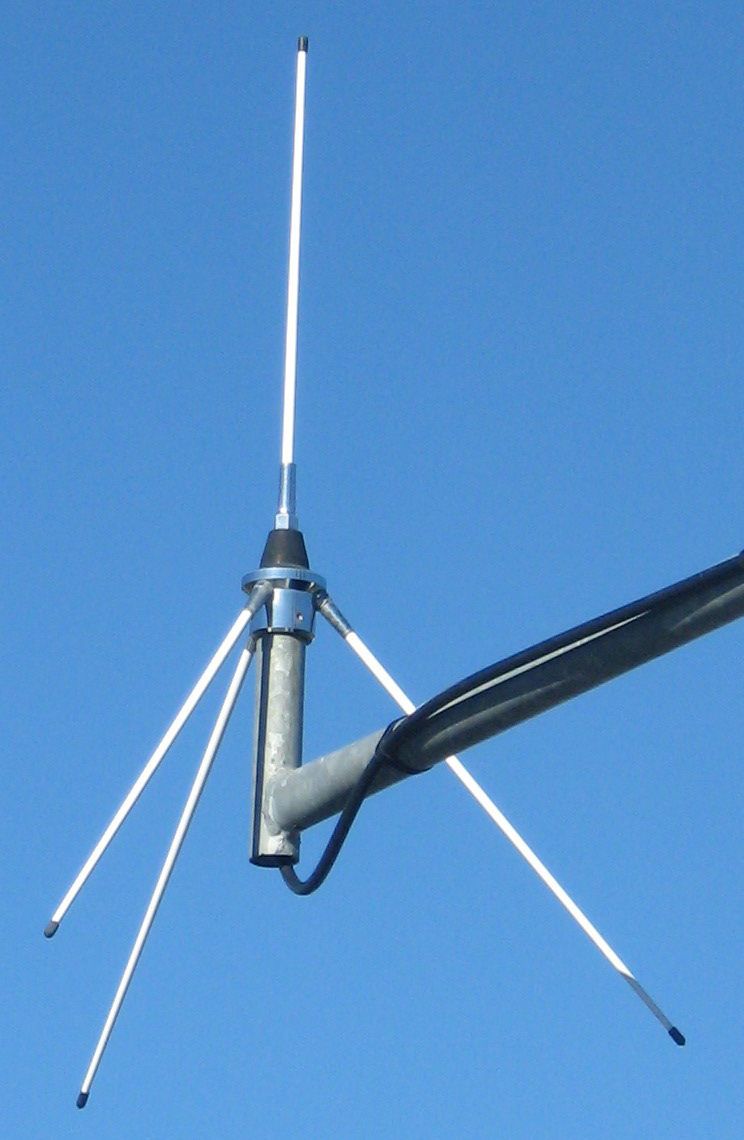
VHF ground plane antenna

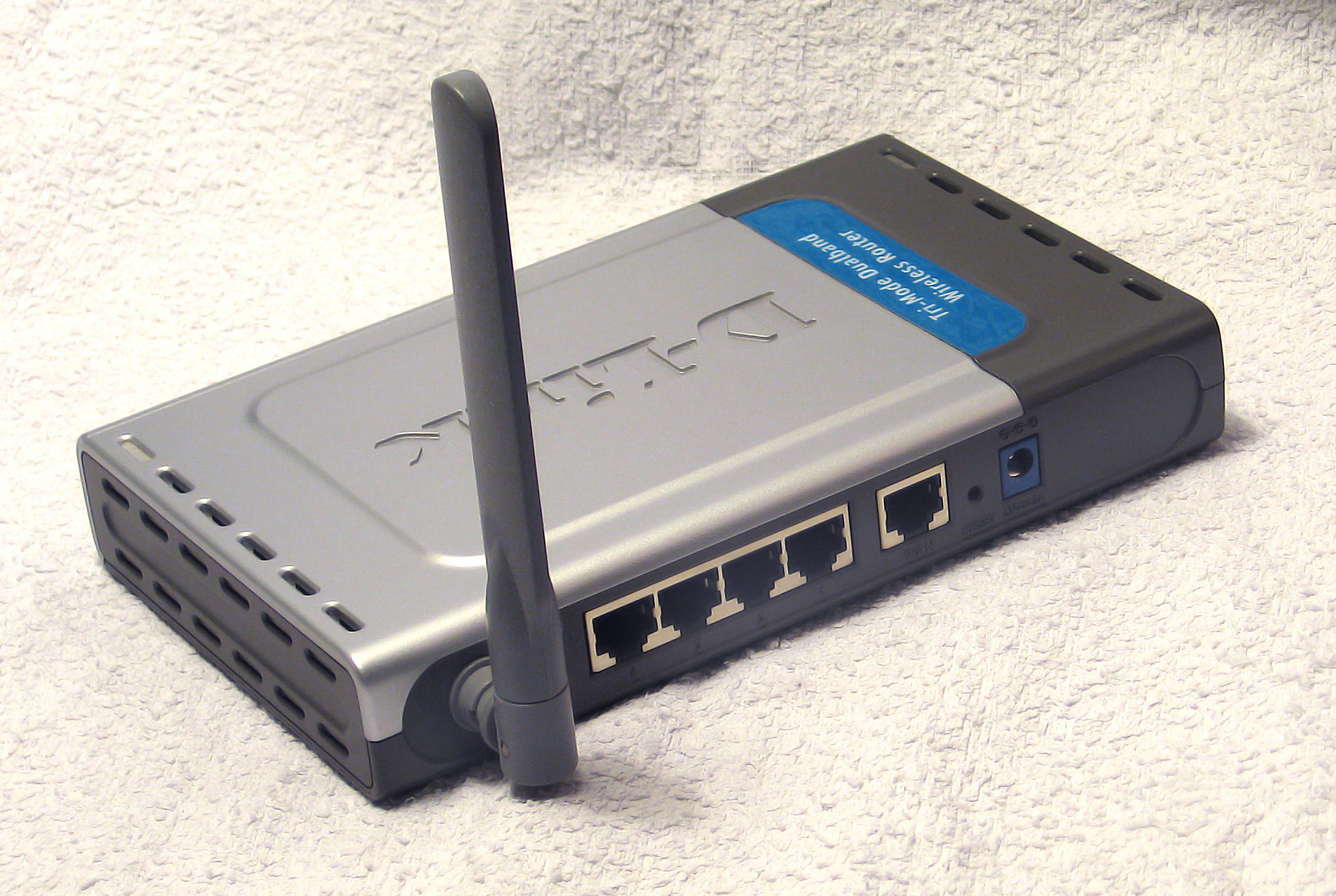
Dual band 2.4 and 5 GHz monopole antenna on a home Wi-Fi router

At higher frequencies in the VHF and UHF bands, the size of the ground plane needed is smaller, so artificial metal ground planes of screen or rods are used to allow the antenna to be mounted above the ground. A common type for mounting on masts or stationary structures is the ground plane antenna, consisting of a quarter-wave whip antenna with a ground plane of 3 or 4 wires or rods a quarter-wavelength long radiating horizontally or diagonally from its base, connected to the ground side of the feedline. Another variation is the discone antenna, which is notable for having a very broad bandwidth. At frequencies above 30 MHz an automobile or aircraft body makes an adequate ground plane, so whip antennas for two-way radios and cell phones are mounted on car bumpers or roofs, and aircraft communication antennas frequently consist of a short conductor in an aerodynamic fairing projecting from the fuselage; this is called a blade antenna.

The quarter-wave whip and rubber ducky antennas used with handheld radios such as walkie-talkies and portable FM radios in the VHF and UHF bands are also monopole antennas. In these portable devices the antenna does not have an effective ground plane, the ground side of the transmitter or receiver is just connected to the chassis ground connection on its circuit board. Since these "ground" conductors are no larger than the element itself the antenna usually functions more like an asymmetrical dipole than a monopole antenna.

A monopole type widely used in Wireless devices and cell phones operating at microwave frequencies is the inverted F antenna (IFA). The monopole element is bent over in an L shape parallel to the ground area on the circuit board, to make it compact enough to be enclosed in the device case; the antenna may be fabricated of copper foil on the printed circuit board itself. To improve the impedance match with the feed circuit the antenna is shunt fed, the feedline is connected to an intermediate point along the element, and the base of the element is grounded. Many variants of this antenna are used in handheld devices, such as multiband versions and meander antennas.

== History ==
Development of Marconi's monopole antenna from Hertz's dipole antenna

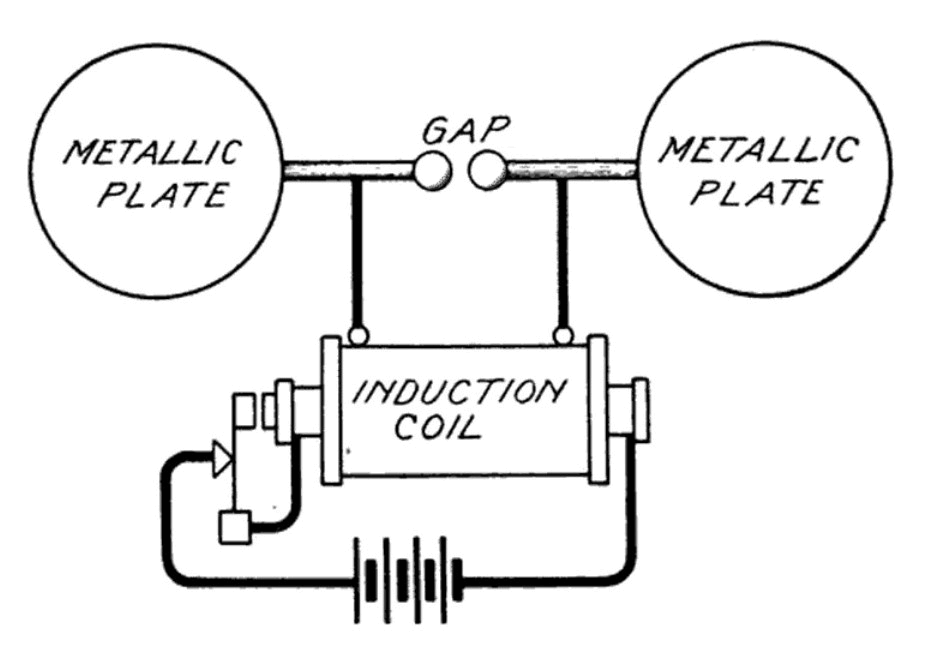
Hertz's dipole antenna transmitter, invented 1886

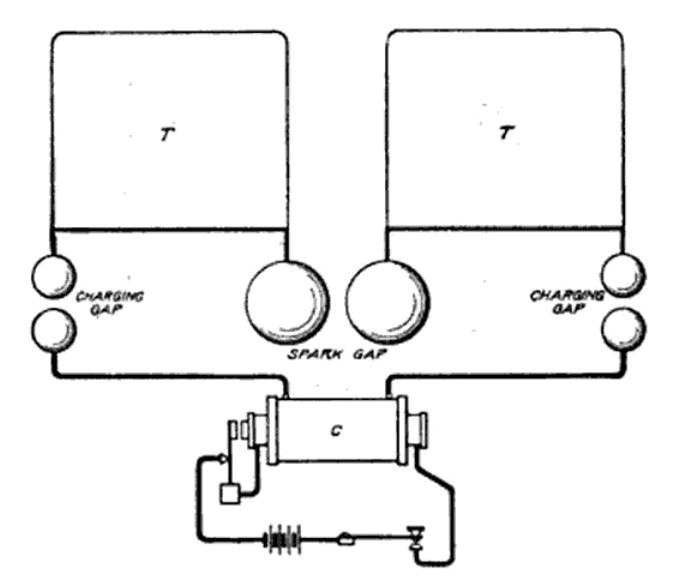
Marconi first tried enlarging the dipole antenna with 6×6 foot metal sheet "capacity areas" (r), 1895 Metal sheets and spark balls not shown to scale.

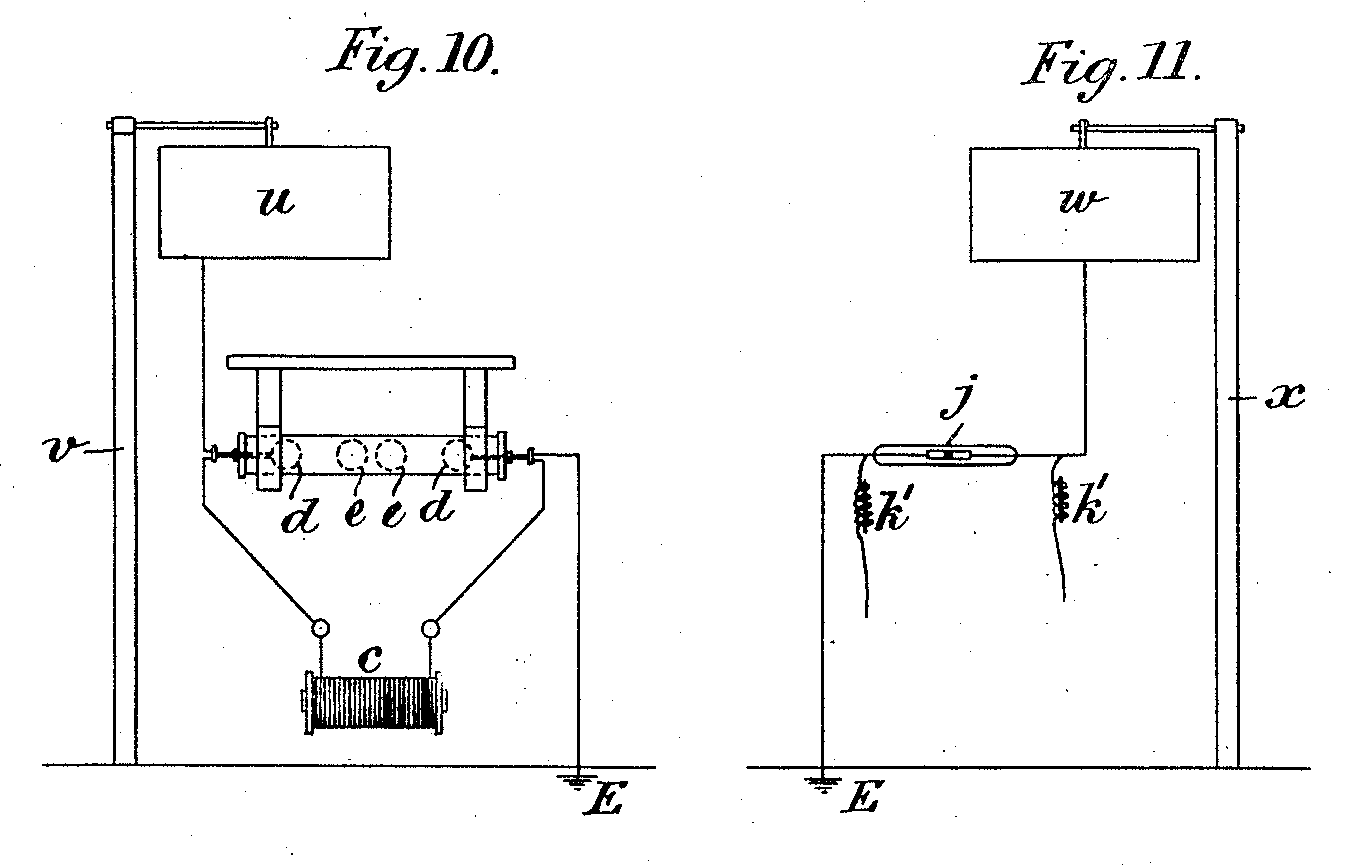
Illustration from Marconi's 1896 patent showing his first monopole antennas, consisting of suspended metal plates (u,w) attached to one terminal of the transmitter (left) and receiver (right), with the other terminal grounded (E). Later he found that the plates were unnecessary and a suspended wire was adequate.

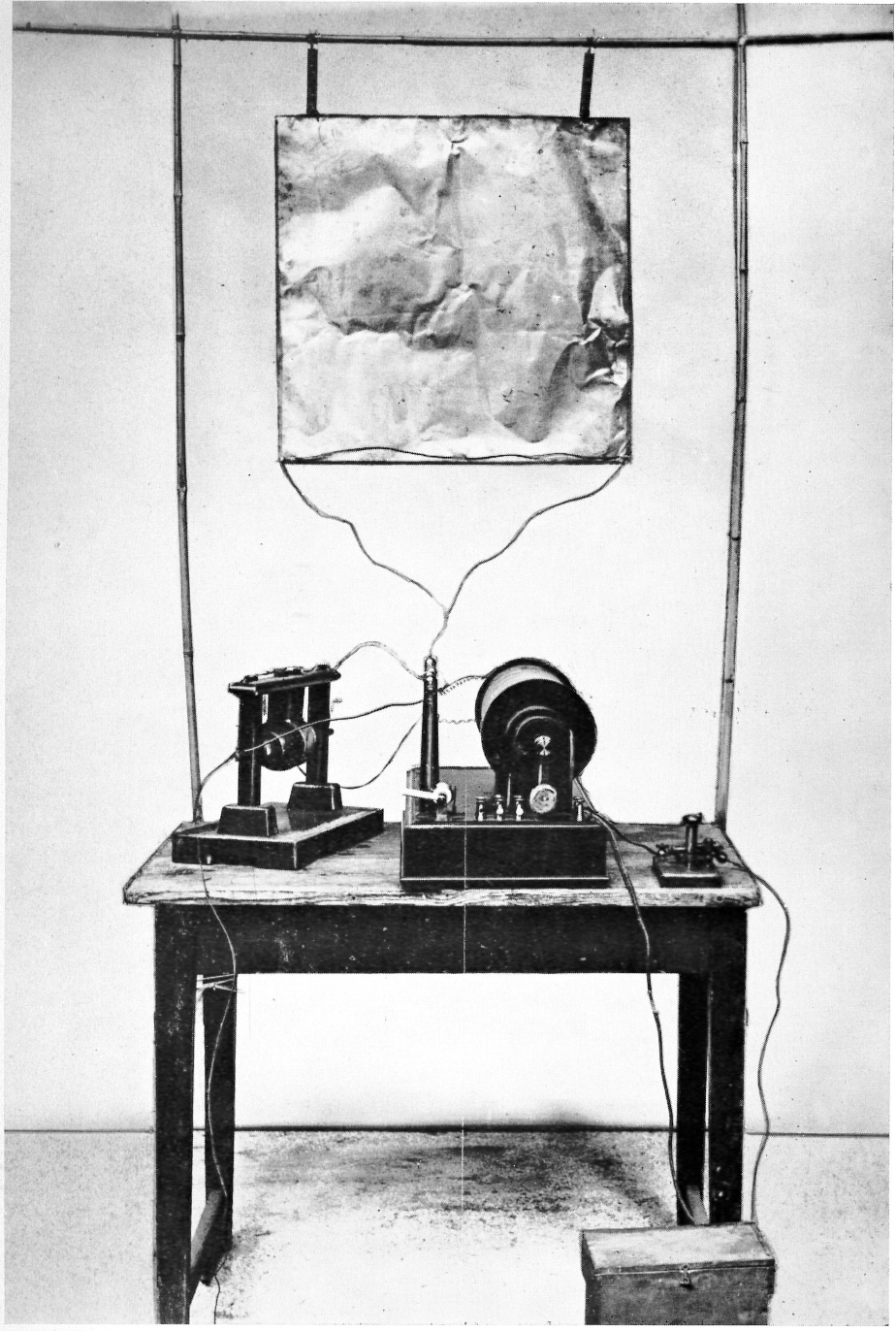
Marconi's first monopole transmitter

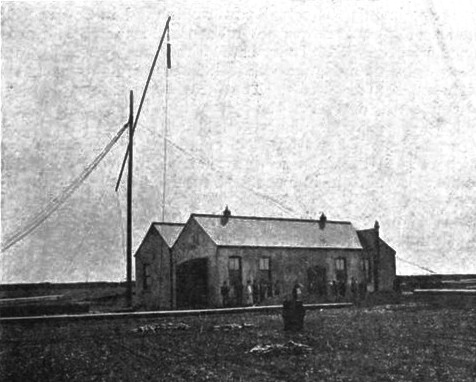
One of Marconi's early monopole antennas at his Poldhu, Cornwall transmitting station, 1900, consisting of a small metal plate suspended from a wooden arm with a long wire running down to the transmitter in the building.

Early vertical antennas. (A) Marconi found suspending the metal plate "capacity area" high above the ground increased range. (B) He found that a simple elevated wire worked just as well. (C-F) Researchers found that multiple parallel wires were a better way to increase capacitance. "Cage antennas" (E-F) distributed current more equally between wires, reducing resistance

The monopole antenna was invented in 1895 and patented in 1896 by radio entrepreneur Guglielmo Marconi during his first experiments in radio communication. He began by using dipole antennas invented by Heinrich Hertz consisting of two identical horizontal wires ending in metal plates, and by his mentor Augusto Righi consisting of four metal spark balls, but was unable to transmit further than about a half mile. He found by experiment that if instead of the dipole, one side of the transmitter and receiver terminals was connected to a wire attached to a metal plate suspended overhead, and the other side was connected to a conductor buried in the Earth, he could transmit for longer distances. (Note: Hong 2010, pp. 2–9, 17–23 discusses the reason Marconi, a self-educated tinkerer, made this discovery, and not the many educated physicists and professors who were also experimenting with wireless. This is generally attributed to the influence on physics of James Clerk Maxwell's 1873 electromagnetic theory, that proved that both light and radio waves were the same phenomenon; electromagnetic waves. Maxwell's theory conditioned physicists to think of radio waves as "invisible light". Thus they assumed that radio waves traveled in straight lines like light and were limited by the horizon. Therefore they believed radio systems could transmit no further than existing optical blinker light or semaphore communication systems, and so were useless for long distance communication. Marconi, an experimentalist free from this bias, thought of radio more as a telegraph without wires, and therefore he tried the telegraphy technique of using the ground as one side of the circuit.) He found the plate was unnecessary and a suspended wire was adequate. The monopole is also called a Marconi antenna, although Alexander Popov independently invented it at about the same time for his lightning detection receiver.

In the next few years, using higher monopole antennas and better transmitters and receivers Marconi steadily increased the range of his radiotelegraphy communication system to hundreds of kilometers (miles), convincing the world that radio was a practical communication method. In 1901 he achieved transatlantic radio transmission using a monopole transmitting antenna consisting of 50 vertical wires suspended in a fan shape from a support cable between 60 meter (200 foot) poles.

Before Marconi, several inventors experimented with wireless communication between vertical aerials, although without creating a practical system. In October 1866 Mahlon Loomis demonstrated communication between two grounded 183-meter (600-foot) wire aerials supported by kites on mountaintops 22 kilometres (14 miles) apart. When one aerial wire was touched to a grounded contact, currents of atmospheric electricity in it apparently generated radio waves which induced currents in the other wire, detected by a sensitive galvanometer. Starting in 1882, Amos Dolbear also used grounded vertical wire antennas during his development of a ground conduction telephone, but his system seems to have worked by electrostatic induction instead of radio waves, and by 1895 he had only achieved distances of 1/4 mile. A suit claiming Marconi infringed Dolbear's 1882 and 1886 wireless patents was dismissed in 1901. In 1885 Thomas Edison patented a system of harbor communication between vertical towers on shore and vertical wires suspended from a ship's mast, but this also worked by electrostatic induction and was never tried.

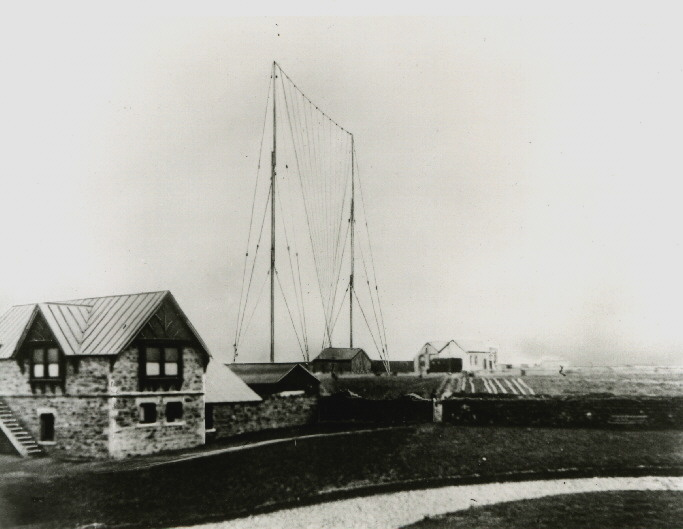
Marconi's transmitting antenna at Poldhu, UK with which he made the first transatlantic radio contact in 1901; a 160 foot fan-shaped 50-wire monopole.

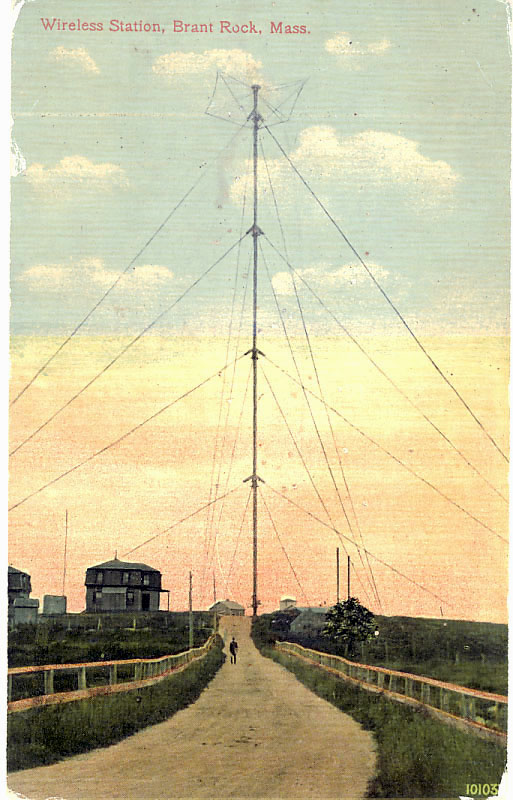
Fessenden's 1906 Brant Rock, MA transatlantic transmitter, an early mast radiator

In the primitive spark transmitters used in Marconi's time, in addition to radiating the radio waves the antenna also served as the resonator which generated the oscillating currents which determine the frequency and thus the wavelength of the waves. Marconi's new antenna functioned as a quarter-wave monopole which radiated with a wavelength of approximately four times its height. This longer antenna greatly increased the wavelength, reducing the frequency of Marconi’s transmitter from the VHF and UHF bands generated by Hertz's antennas which could not transmit beyond the horizon, to the MF band. Also, it emitted vertically polarized radio waves, instead of the horizontally polarized waves produced by the Hertz antenna. Longer radio waves have less attenuation with distance. These longer vertically polarized waves could propagate as ground waves which can follow the curvature of the Earth, and could also reflect off the ionosphere (called the 'skip' or skywave mechanism), and thus travel beyond the visual horizon. This explains the increased range.

Marconi, who was self-educated in physics, did not understand any of this at the time; he merely discovered an empirical relation between antenna height and transmission distance. He credited Prof. Moisè Ascoli of Rome with first calculating in 1897 that the antenna radiated at a wavelength of four times its height. An integral equation for the current in wire antennas was derived by Henry Pocklington in 1897, who showed the current was approximately a sinusoidal standing wave. Around 1898 André Blondel used image theory to show that the monopole had the same radiation pattern as a vertical dipole antenna of twice the length. A more useful version of the Pocklington equation, the Hallen equation, was derived by Erik Hallén beginning in 1938. These integral equations are the starting point in modern analyses of monopoles, and are solved numerically in modern computer antenna simulation programs. (Note: The history of the mathematical modeling of thin antennas is given in Raines 2007, pp. 5–6 and in more detail in King 1956, pp. 4–8. The integral equations of Pocklington and Hallen gave series approximations for the current and fields but could only be solved for simple geometries. Prior to computers, the radiation pattern of antennas was calculated either by solving one of these equations, or if this was not possible, by simply assuming a sinusoidal current distribution similar to a transmission line, and calculating the fields from Maxwell's equations using radiation integrals. In 1968 Roger F. Harrington published his book on the method of moments, a finite difference numerical algorithm that could calculate the currents and radiation of an arbitrarily shaped antenna modeled by a network of wire segments. This became the basis of the first widely used antenna simulation computer programs like NEC, which was written in 1979. These programs made antenna currents and radiation patterns easy to calculate without complicated math, so as computers became more widespread since 1980 they have become the standard method of design and the older transmission line methods have become less widely known.)

Multiwire monopoles used during the radiotelegraphy era, 1900 - 1920s

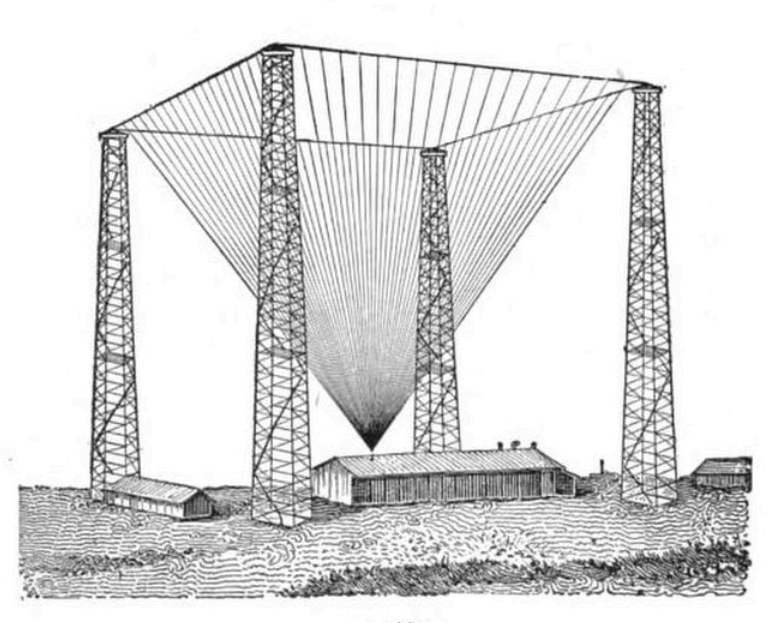
Marconi 210 ft (64 meter) inverted cone monopole transmitting antenna, Poldhu, UK, built 1902

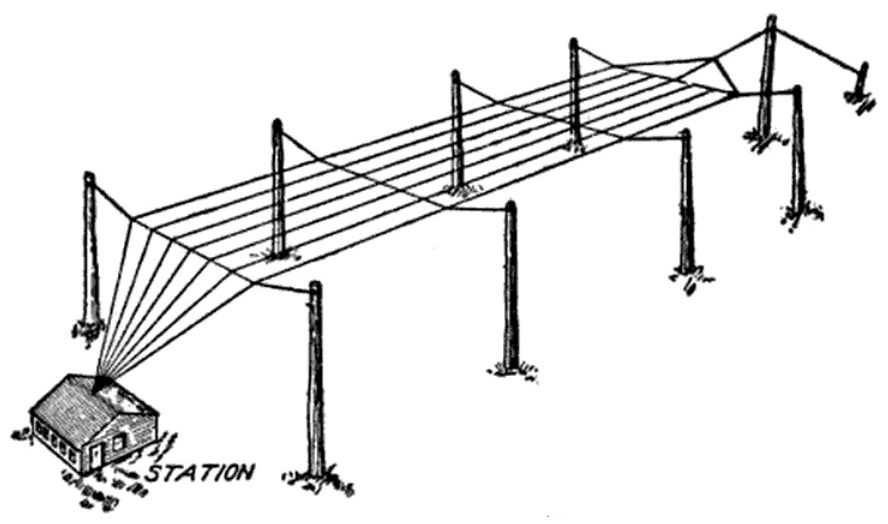
An inverted-L, "triatic" or "flattop" antenna, a monopole used in long distance radiotelegraphy transmitting stations at frequencies below 50 kHz, invented by Marconi in 1904

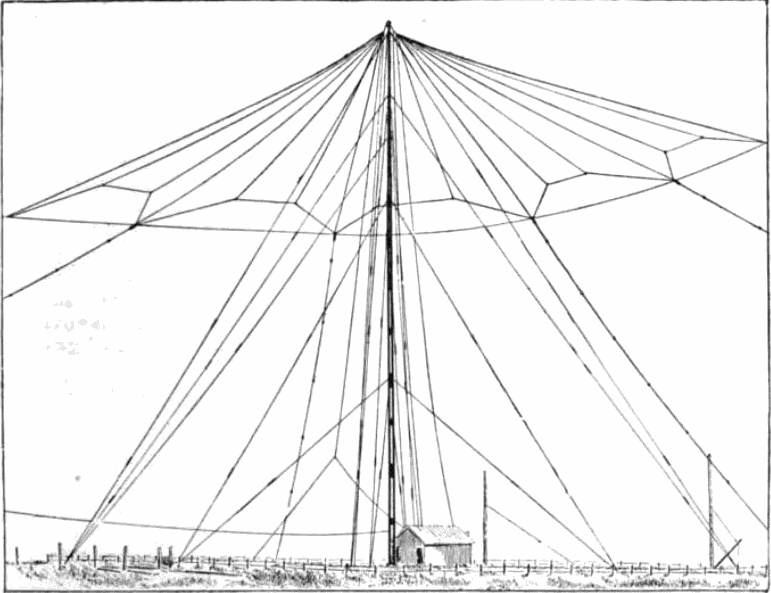
Umbrella antenna of radiotelegraph station near Newcastle, UK in 1910

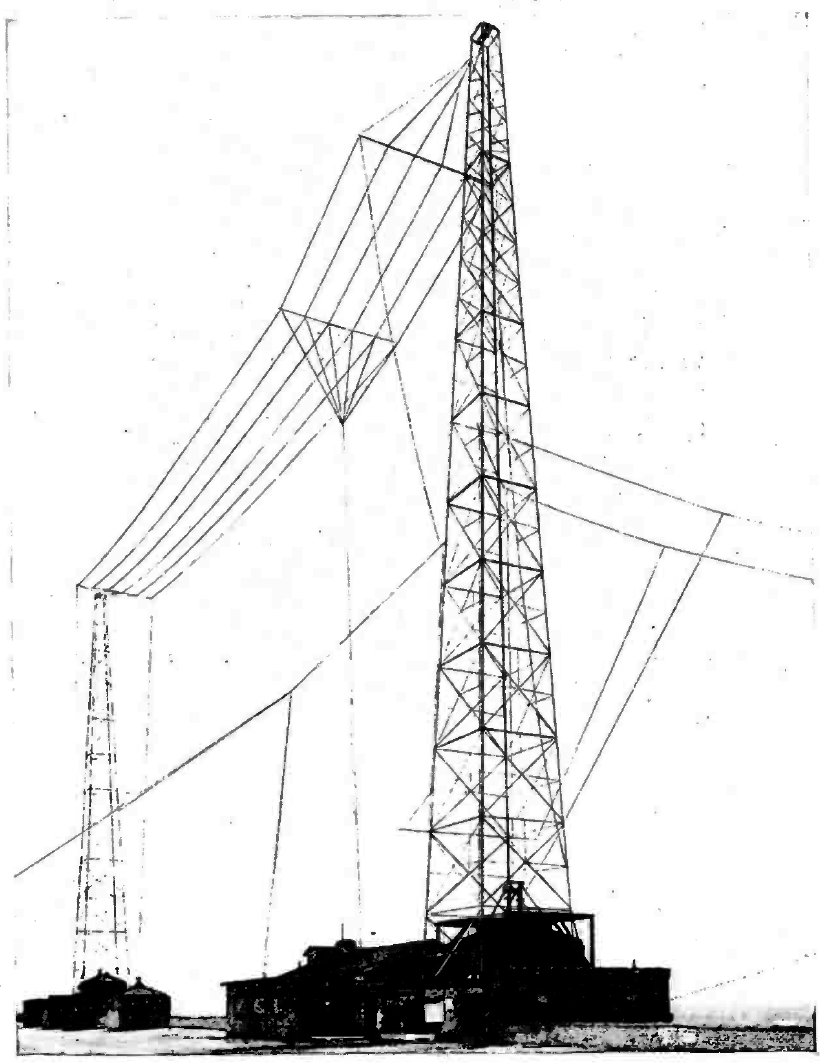
T antenna of radio station WBZ, 833 kHz, Springfield, MA, built in 1921.

During the radiotelegraphy era, the first two decades of radio from 1900 until the 1920s, radio communication systems used long wavelengths above 200 meters (frequencies below 1.5 MHz), in the MF, LF and VLF bands. Monopoles were the main antennas used. At the longer wavelengths used for long distance communication the tallest antenna masts that could be practically constructed were much shorter than the resonant length, one-quarter wavelength. Monopole antennas this short are inefficient; due to their low radiation resistance of 5 to 20 ohms, a large fraction of the transmitter power was wasted in the ground system resistance. The main technique known for increasing radiated power was to add conductors to the top of the antenna, to increase the capacitance to ground and thus the antenna current. Marconi and others developed huge multiwire capacitively top-loaded monopole antennas which were more efficient at these frequencies, such as the harp, inverted cone, inverted L, T antenna and umbrella antenna. These were the main antennas during this period, and the latter three are still the main transmitting antennas used at these low frequencies. When radio broadcasting began in the MF band in the early 1920s, the typical transmitting antenna was the T-antenna. This required two masts, an extensive land area, and currents in the masts distorted the radiation pattern.

Two papers published in 1924 by Stuart Ballantine led to the adoption of the single-mast monopole radiator. One derived the radiation resistance of a vertical monopole antenna over a perfect ground plane. He found that the radiation resistance increased to a maximum at a length of a half wavelength, so a mast around that length had an input impedance that was much higher than the ground resistance, reducing the fraction of transmitter power that was lost in the ground system, eliminating the need for capacitive top loads. In a second paper the same year he showed that the amount of power radiated horizontally in ground waves reached a maximum at a mast height of 5/8 wavelength (.625$\lambda$). Due to these discoveries, by 1930 the disadvantages of the T antenna led broadcasters to adopt the half-wave mast radiator antenna in the medium frequency band. Radial wire ground systems were developed at the same time to reduce ground losses.

The advent of handheld radios in the 1950s and 1960s, the transistor radio and walkie-talkie, made possible by the invention of the transistor in 1947, motivated the development of compact monopole antennas for them, like the retractable quarter-wave whip and the rubber ducky antenna.

== Elementary description of operation ==
A monopole antenna, like the dipole antenna from which it is derived, is a resonant antenna; it not only emits and receives radio waves but acts as an electrical resonator. When the radio frequency alternating current applied to its feedpoint is near one of its resonant frequencies, in addition to radiating the power as radio waves, energy is stored in the antenna as oscillating electric currents called standing waves. The advantage of this is that the stored energy is larger than the energy fed to the antenna each cycle by the transmitter (or in a receiving antenna the energy absorbed from the radio waves), so most of the current in the antenna is due to this stored energy. As a result the antenna current at resonance is larger than the current when the antenna is driven at other frequencies. The radio wave power radiated by an antenna is proportional to the square of the antenna current, so an antenna fed at a resonant frequency radiates much more power than the same antenna fed with the same voltage at some other frequency. An antenna only absorbs all the input power from the feedline when it is in a condition of resonance.

The vertical conductor acts somewhat like a transmission line stub, open-circuited at the top. The oscillation modes are analogous to the mechanical oscillations of an elastic beam anchored at one end. The current and voltage along the element are sinusoidal waves. The current in the antenna element bounces back and forth between the ends, and the two equal but opposite current waves interfere to form a standing wave. The standing wave has a current node at its top and either a node or an antinode at bottom. Due to these end conditions the monopole is resonant (has pure resistive input impedance) at a length of a quarter wavelength or multiples of it.

In the common quarter wave monopole, the top end of the vertical rod and the ground plane act as capacitor plates which have opposite charges, storing energy in an electric field, while the middle of the rod acts as an inductor which stores energy in a magnetic field, so the entire antenna acts like a series-resonant tuned circuit. If the top of the rod is negatively charged and the ground plane positively charged at the beginning of the cycle, the current begins to flow up the rod from the ground plane, creating a circular magnetic field around the rod. The negative charge at the top and positive charge on the ground plane decrease until they reach zero. However the current continues, because the inductance of the rod resists changes in current. The current begins to charge the top of the rod positive and the ground plane negative. From Faraday's law of induction the energy to create this separation of charge comes from the magnetic field, which decreases. Finally when the magnetic field reaches zero the current stops with the charges reversed, the top of the rod is charged positive and the ground plane negative. Then the current begins to flow in the opposite direction, down the rod, generating a magnetic field circling in the opposite direction, until the charges reverse again to their original polarity, with the top of the rod negative and the ground plane positive. This oscillation keeps repeating, with the energy stored alternately in the electric field and the magnetic field each half-cycle of the applied alternating current.

Most of these coupled oscillating electric and magnetic fields are near fields (also called reactive or induction fields) which store energy in the space around the antenna, but some of the fields leave the antenna and travel away as electromagnetic waves, radio waves, carrying energy with them. The radiated power is provided by incoming power from the feedline. Due to this power loss, an antenna acts as if it has a resistance, the radiation resistance, at its feedpoint.

As a result, a monopole acts electrically like a lossy tuned circuit; in general it has both electrical resistance and reactance at its feedpoint. The input resistance has two components; the radiation resistance (normally the largest part) and the loss resistance due to ohmic losses in the antenna conductor and ground plane. At resonance the input impedance is just this pure resistance; at other frequencies it has reactance in addition to the resistance, and thus a higher impedance.

A transmitting antenna will absorb all the power applied to its feedpoint only if it is conjugate impedance matched to the feedline from the transmitter. This means the resistance of the antenna and line must be equal, and the reactance of antenna and line must be opposite. If it is not impedance matched, some of the transmitter power from the feedline will be reflected back down the line toward the transmitter, causing a high SWR, resulting in inefficiency and possibly overheating the transmitter or line, or causing arcing. Similarly, a receiving antenna will only transfer a maximum amount of radio power to the receiver if it is impedance matched to the line.

=== Ground plane ===
Most monopoles have a conducting surface under the vertical rod, a ground plane, connected to the ground side of the feedline. The ground plane is an integral part of the antenna; it has two functions. First, it reflects the downward directed radio waves from the rod, increasing the power radiated above the ground. Second, it acts as a capacitor plate, receiving the displacement current (alternating electric field) from the rod, returning it to the ground side of the feedline. Without it there will be induced currents on the outside of the shield conductor of the feedline, which will act as additional antenna.

The current in the ground plane is radial, directed alternately toward and away from the ground terminal at the base of the antenna. Therefore far from the antenna the radio waves radiated by the currents in opposite sides of the plane have opposite phase and largely cancel. So the plane itself does not radiate; it acts as a mirror for the radio waves from the rod.

The electric field is vertical where it enters the ground plane, identical to the field of a vertical dipole antenna at its symmetry plane. If the ground plane is large enough, due to the waves reflected from it the antenna acts as if it has an image antenna identical to the monopole underneath the plane. The antenna rod and its image together act like a dipole antenna of twice the length, so a monopole over an infinite, perfectly conducting plane has a radiation pattern identical to the top half of the pattern of a vertical dipole of twice the length. For the quarter wave monopole, the antenna acts like a half wave dipole. Because the antenna only radiates its power into half the space of a dipole antenna, its gain is twice (or in decibels, 3 dB greater than) the gain of an equivalent dipole.

The actual gain and radiation pattern is dependent on the size and conductivity of the ground plane. To function as a mirror the plane must extend least a half wavelength from the monopole element. Low frequency monopole transmitting antennas use the Earth itself as the ground plane. They require a good low resistance connection to the Earth for efficiency, since the soil has significant resistance which is in series with the antenna and consumes transmitter power. These use a radial ground system consisting of many bare copper wires buried shallowly in the earth, radiating from a ground terminal at the base of the antenna, preferably to a distance of a quarter to a half wavelength.

Because of the unbalanced impedance of the ground plane, monopole antennas are usually fed from an unbalanced transmission line, most often coaxial cable.

== Current distribution on antenna ==
Calculating the current distribution along a thin linear antenna, which determines the radiation pattern and electrical characteristics, requires solving Maxwell's equations for the coupled current, electric and magnetic fields at the surface of the element, driven by the electric field of the sinusoidal feed voltage from the transmitter applied to the antenna's feedpoint (or in a receiving antenna by the incoming fields of the radio wave). The Pocklington integral equation (Henry Pocklington, 1897) or Hallen integral equation (Erik Hallén, 1938) give the current on thin cylindrical antennas. In general, accurate calculation of an antenna's electrical properties is mathematically difficult, and antenna simulation computer programs like NEC are usually used.

If the ground plane is a good conductor larger in radius than the height of the element (which will be assumed in this section), it approximates a perfect infinite ground plane, and the current and radiation can be calculated by replacing the monopole and plane with a vertical dipole antenna of twice the height. For smaller planes, for accurate results resonances in the ground plane and refraction around the edges must also be taken into account, so the current distribution in the plane must also be calculated.

The current in the monopole element is approximately a sinusoidal standing wave $I(z)$ composed of two superimposed traveling current waves, one $i_\text{up}(z, t)$ moving up the antenna and reflecting from the top, the other $i_\text{down}(z, t)$ moving down and reflecting from the ground plane.

$$i(z,t) = I(z)\cos{\omega t}= i_\text{up}(z, t) +  i_\text{down}(z, t)$$

To a first approximation, from the Pocklington equation the current on a thin antenna is given by the Helmholtz equation

$$\frac {{\partial^2} I(z)} {\partial z^2} + k^2 I(z) = 0$$

This is the same as the Telegrapher's equation for a lossless transmission line, explaining why linear antennas behave like transmission lines. Solving for the monopole element, and applying the boundary conditions $I(h) = 0$ and for a base-fed antenna $I(0) = I_\text{0}$, the peak radio frequency current $I(z)$ at a height of $z$ on the monopole is approximately a sinusoidal standing wave with a node at the top.

$I(z) = I_\text{max}\sin {k(h - z)} = I_0{\sin {k(h - z)} \over \sin {kh}}$

so the current on the antenna as a function of time and height is

$$i(z, t) = I_0{\sin {k(h - z)} \over \sin {kh}}\cos 2\pi ft$$

where

$h$ is the length of the monopole element.
$f$ is the frequency of the feed current.
$k = {2\pi \over \lambda} = {2\pi f \over c}$ is the wavenumber in radians per meter. $kh$ is the electrical length of the element in radians.
$I_\text{max}$ is the loop current, the current at the antinode of the standing wave. In a monopole of $\lambda/4$ or longer it is the maximum current on the antenna.
$I_0$ is the input current at the base of the element, for base-fed monopoles
$z$ is the height on the element measured from the ground plane

The current is close to 90° out of phase with the feed voltage at the bottom. It lags the feed voltage in a transmitting antenna and leads the feed in a receiving antenna.

This approximation assumes the Q factor of the antenna is much greater than one; (Note: The Q of real antennas is never large, unless they are capacitively loaded. It is difficult practically to make a nonsuperconductive antenna thin enough with a high enough conductivity to get a Q over about 20. But theoretically as the antenna is made thinner the Q goes to infinity.Schelkunoff & Friis 1952, p. 259) in other words the stored energy is much larger than the feed energy per cycle which is equal to the radiated energy. This is a good approximation for a thin antenna driven at resonance. Although it is numerically accurate for a diameter-to-wavelength ratio $2b/\lambda$ less than 10^{−4}, it is a good approximation up to $2b/\lambda < .05$ and applies qualitatively even to thick monopoles. For finite width monopoles the current does not quite go to zero at the nodes, and the 180 degree phase change there is not abrupt but occurs continuously over a short distance centered on the node.

Since this approximation assumes the energy applied by the feedline, and the energy lost to radiation, are negligible, the voltage across the feedline and the radiation resistance are implicitly assumed to be zero. An improved approximation takes the radiation process into account

$$I(z) = I_0\sin {k(h - z)} + jp I_0(\cos kz - \cos kh)$$

The current is the sum of two terms: the original sinusoidal wave which is 90° out of phase with the feed voltage, and a second smaller wave induced by the back reaction of the radiation fields on the antenna. This wave is in phase with the feed voltage and supplies the radiated power. Since at any point on the element this current must supply the power radiated by the portion of element above it, it decreases with height along the element to zero at the top. The factor $p$ depends on antenna length, and decreases with diameter

== Input impedance ==
For most monopole antennas ohmic resistance is small, so the input resistance mainly consists of the radiation resistance $R_\text{R}$. Over a perfectly conducting infinite ground plane, the input impedance of a monopole is half that of a center-fed dipole twice the length. The impedance of a linear antenna can be found using the induced EMF method invented by Léon Brillouin, by calculating the near fields, and integrating the Poynting vector over the surface of the antenna rod. For a thin, base-fed monopole up to about $h = \pi/4$ long, in which the thickness $2b$ of the element is much less than the wavelength ($kb \ll 1$), over a perfectly conducting infinite ground plane, the radiation resistance $R_\text{R}$ and reactance $X_\text{R}$ in ohms are

$R_\text{R} = {\eta \over 4\pi\sin^2 kh}\Biggl\{\text{Cin}(2kh) + {1 \over 2}\sin 2kh\Bigl[\text{Si}(4kh) - 2\text{Si}(2kh)\Bigr] + {1 \over 2}\cos 2kh\Bigl[2\text{Cin}(2kh) - \text{Cin}(4kh)\Bigr] \biggr\}$ (1)

$X_\text{R} = {\eta \over 4\pi\sin^2 kh}\biggl\{\text{Si}(2kh) + \cos 2kh\Bigl[\text{Si}(2kh) - {1 \over 2}\text{Si}(4kh)\Bigr] - \sin 2kh\Bigl[\ln (h/b) - \text{Cin}(2kh) + {1 \over 2}\text{Cin}(4kh) + {1 \over 2}\text{Cin}(kb^2/h)\Bigr] \biggr\}$ (2)

Measured input resistance and reactance of a monopole as a function of length $h$ for different length to diameter ratios ($h/2b$). The lines for a given length/diameter are colored the same in the two graphs.

where

$k = {2\pi \over \lambda} = {2\pi f \over c}$ is the wavenumber. $kh$ is the electrical length of the element in radians
$b$ is the radius of the element
$\eta = \sqrt{\mu_\text{0} \over \epsilon_\text{0}}$ = 376.73 ohms is the impedance of free space
$\text{Si}(x) = \int\limits_{0}^{x}{\sin t \over t} dt$ is the sine integral
$\text{Cin}(x) = \int_0^x \frac{1 - \cos t}{t} dt$ is the modified cosine integral

These equations are exact for an infinitely thin antenna.

For antennas a quarter-wavelength or shorter with thickness much smaller than a wavelength over perfect ground these approximate formulas are useful
$$\quad R_\text{R} =
\begin{cases}
10(kh)^2 \qquad\quad  0 < h < \lambda/8 \\
12.35(kh)^{2.5} \quad  \lambda/8 < h < \lambda/4 \\
5.57(kh)^{4.17} \;\quad  \lambda/4 < h < 0.3183\lambda
\end{cases}$$

$$X_\text{R} = -{60 \over kh}(\ln {h \over b} - 1)$$

== Resonant frequencies and lengths ==
A monopole antenna is resonant (has pure resistive input impedance, no reactance) at a series of frequencies, which depend on its length $h$. These are important because it is easier to match the transmission line to the antenna at resonance. To find them precisely, antenna simulation computer programs must be used. However, for most monopole and dipole antennas in which the element is not excessively thick, the resonant frequencies are often calculated approximately by regarding the conductor as an open-ended single wire transmission line (resonant stub). As in a resonant stub, the phase difference between the current and voltage standing waves is close to 90°. This means the voltage standing wave has an antinode (maximum) at each current node (minimum), and a node (minimum) at each current antinode (maximum).

=== Series resonances ===
The condition for resonance in a monopole, analogous to a vibrating string, is that when the sinusoidal current wave travels a round trip from one end of the monopole element to the other and back, the reflected wave must arrive at its starting point in phase with the original wave, so the two waves reinforce.

The wave travels along the element at a velocity close to the speed of light $c$. The distance the wave travels in one period $T = 1/f$ is the wavelength $\lambda$ where

$$\lambda = {c \over f}$$

Therefore the phase change in radians of the wave from one end of the element to the other is $kh = 2\pi {h \over \lambda}$. For a round trip the phase change is twice this, $4\pi {h \over \lambda}$. At the ends of the element there can be an additional phase change, which depends on the end conditions. For a monopole at the so-called series resonances:

- The current reflects from the top with a 180° ($\pi$ radians) phase change: At the top of the element, the total current must be zero because there is no place for it to go, making this point a current node (zero) of the standing wave. So the upward and downward traveling waves must have equal but opposite amplitude there, $i_\text{up}(h, t) = -i_\text{down}(h, t)$, The upward current wave is said to "reflect" from the top end of the element with opposite phase.
- The current reflects from the ground plane with no phase change: The downward wave travels down the element, through the feedline to the transmitter and back, and at the bottom reflects from the ground plane to become the upward wave. The ground plane, which can be modeled as a large capacitor plate connected to the ground conductor of the feedline, acts as a current source or sink, its voltage is approximately zero regardless of the current into it. Therefore the element has a voltage node (zero) and a current antinode (maximum) there. Since the voltage waves must be equal and opposite at the ground plane, $v_\text{up}(0, t) = -v_\text{down}(0, t)$, and there is a sign change due to the opposite directions of the currents, the upward and downward current waves are always equal in amplitude there, they are in phase

$$i_\text{up}(0, t) = -C {dv_\text{up}(0, t) \over dt} = -C {d[-v_\text{down}(0, t)] \over dt} = i_\text{down}(0, t)$$

The sine wave repeats every $2\pi$ radians (360°). So for resonance the total phase change $\Phi$ during a round trip along the antenna element, including the $\pi$ (180°) phase shift at the top, must be $2\pi$ or an integral multiple of it

$$\Phi = 4\pi{h \over \lambda} + \pi = 2\pi m  \qquad  m \in 1, 2, 3,...$$

Solving for $h$ and substituting $m = n + 1$ the monopole antenna is resonant at a length of a quarter wavelength or an odd multiple of it

$h \approx {\lambda \over 4} + n{\lambda \over 2} = \big({1 \over 4} + {n \over 2} \big){c \over f} \qquad n \in 0, 1, 2, 3,...$

$$h \approx {\lambda \over 4}, {3\lambda \over 4}, {5\lambda \over 4},...$$

(The resonant lengths are actually slightly shorter than this, see End effects section below.) For a given length $h$ the corresponding resonant frequencies $f_\text{n}$ are

$f_\text{n} \approx \big({1 \over 4} + {n \over 2}\big){c \over h} \qquad n \in 0, 1, 2, 3,...$

The lowest resonant frequency, $f_\text{0}$, at which the antenna is a quarter-wavelength ($\lambda/4$) long, is called the fundamental resonance, while the higher resonances, which are multiples of the fundamental, are called harmonics.

These are sometimes called the series resonant frequencies because near these frequencies the antenna acts similar electrically to a series resonant tuned circuit. Because the feedpoint at the bottom of the antenna is a voltage node (minimum) and current antinode (maximum), at these frequencies the input impedance, equal to the ratio of voltage to current, is a minimum. For a $\lambda/4$ monopole it is 36.5 ohms (as shown below).

=== Parallel resonances ===
The monopole can also resonate at a second series of lengths, at which the bottom end of the element is a current node (minimum) instead of a current antinode (maximum). So the element has a node of the current standing wave at both top and bottom, it is equivalent to an end-fed vertical dipole antenna (so some sources do not call this antenna a monopole). The resonant frequencies can be calculated by a derivation similar to that in the previous section, but it is easier to note that a standing wave has a node at intervals of one-half wavelength. Therefore the antenna is resonant at lengths at which it is a half-wavelength long or a multiple of it

$h \approx n{\lambda \over 2} = {nc \over 2f} \qquad n \in 1, 2, 3,...$

$$h \approx {\lambda \over 2}, \lambda, {3\lambda \over 2}, 2\lambda,...$$

For a given length $h$ the corresponding resonant frequencies are

$f_\text{n} \approx {nc \over 2h} \qquad n \in 1, 2, 3,...$

These are sometimes called parallel resonances or antiresonances because the antenna acts similar to a parallel resonant (antiresonant) tuned circuit. When fed at the bottom, due to the current node and voltage antinode there the antenna has a very high input resistance, which is difficult to calculate. For a hypothetical infinitely thin element it would be infinite, so there would be no input current. For a typical finite thickness monopole element it is around 700 - 3000 ohms depending on thickness. It also has a very high rate of change of reactance with frequency about the resonance point, which gives the antenna a narrower bandwidth than at the series resonances.

To reduce the impedance enough to match a transmission line, either an impedance matching circuit or shunt feed must be used. An advantage is that since it acts as a dipole the current in the ground system is low, so ground losses are minimized; for thin antennas a ground plane is not needed at all.

In practice monopoles are mainly used at the two lowest resonant frequencies; where the element is one quarter of the wavelength long ($\lambda/4$), the quarter-wave monopole, or one half of the wavelength long ($\lambda/2$), the half-wave monopole, because their radiation patterns consist of a single lobe in horizontal directions, perpendicular to the antenna axis. Higher harmonics are little used since they have more complicated radiation patterns consisting of multiple lobes directed at angles into the sky with nulls (directions of minimum radiation) between them, resulting in locations with no reception.

=== End effects ===
Diagram of the peak electric field (E) around a quarter-wave monopole antenna (A), showing the spreading of field lines at top. This causes more charge to be stored per unit length near the top of the antenna. To deposit and remove this extra charge each cycle, the oscillating current distribution in the element (I(z), red line) departs from a sine wave (blue line) near the top, decreasing faster with height, reducing the resonant length (h) below λ/4.

Fractional reduction of resonant length of monopole as a function of element diameter. The resonant length decreases with increasing diameter of the element. If $r$ is the reduction factor above, the resonant length of a quarter wave monopole is

$h = r{\lambda \over 4} = r{c \over 4f}$

As the ratio of rod diameter to wavelength increases, the node (N) of the standing wave moves further above the end of the element, so at a given frequency the antenna is resonant at a shorter length.

The exact lengths at which physical monopoles are resonant, found by solving the equation $X_\text{R}(h) = 0$ above or by using antenna simulation programs, are a little shorter than the harmonic resonant lengths $h$ calculated in the previous section, and depend on the element's diameter.

This is due to the shape of the electric field (fringing field) at the top end of the element (A) which spreads out in a fan (see diagram). This adds capacitance and reduces the inductance at the end. Due to this ability to store more charge per unit length, near the top the standing wave current profile (I(z), red line) differs from a sine wave, decreasing faster with height. When approximated as a sine wave (blue line), this is equivalent to the node of the standing wave (N) occurring not at the top of the antenna but some distance above it. (Note: The effect of this on the antenna is similar to if the current wave traveled along the element at a phase velocity $v_\text{p}$ that is lower than the speed of light $c$, as in a transmission line. Some sources describe it this way: Carr & Hippisley 2012, p. 105; Rudge & Milne 1982, p. 564. However this is not a physically accurate description; the phase velocity is not constant along the element, as in a transmission line.) So the resonant length of the element (h) is shorter than a multiple of one quarter of the free space wavelength $\lambda = c / f$ from the previous section.

The thicker the element is, the larger the end capacitance and the shorter the resonant length.

Another common way of saying this is that the resonant frequencies depend on the electrical length of the element (length in wavelengths of the current in the conductor), not the physical length (length measured in wavelengths of the radio wave in free space). The electrical length of a linear antenna is longer than its physical length, so the resonant frequencies are lower than would be calculated from its physical length.

From the equations $R_\text{R}(h)$ and $X_\text{R}(h)$ above, a thin monopole exactly one-quarter free space wavelength long, $h = .25\lambda$, fed at bottom, has an inductive input impedance of

$Z(h = {\lambda \over 4}) = R_\text{R} + jX_\text{R} = {\eta \over 8\pi} \text{Cin}(2\pi) + j{\eta \over 4\pi}\big[2\text{Si}({\pi \over 2}) - {1 \over 2}\text{Si}(\pi)\big] = 36.54 + j21.25$ ohms

To make it resonant it can be shortened to .237$\lambda$ at which length it has an input impedance of $34 + j0$ ohms.

In addition, anything which adds capacitance to the antenna element, such as the presence of grounded objects or high permittivity dielectric materials like insulating coatings or supporting electrical insulators near the end of the element will further decrease the resonant length.

These are collectively called "end effects". A widely used rule of thumb is that, due to these effects the resonant length $h$ of a quarter-wave monopole antenna is about 5% shorter than its nominal length of $\lambda/4$ from the previous section, or for $h$ in meters

$h = 0.95{c \over 4f} = {71.25 \over f \text{(in MHz)}}$

An empirical formula for the actual resonant length of the quarter-wave monopole as a function of element length-to-diameter ratio $\alpha = h/2b$ is

$$h = 0.24\lambda{\alpha \over 1 - \alpha}$$

As can be seen from the reactance graph in the impedance section, at the half wavelength resonance the length/diameter ratio and other end effects have a much larger influence on the resonant length.

In the rest of the article, when the resonant length of a monopole is mentioned, it is assumed to include this correction.

== Radiation pattern ==
Three dimensional (top) and two dimensional vertical (bottom) radiation patterns of monopole antennas of different lengths over a perfect infinite ground plane, with length $h$ given in wavelengths. The distance of the graph from the origin in any direction is proportional to the magnitude of the electric field of the radio wave radiated in that direction. The bottom graphs are a vertical section through the axis of the top 3 dimensional pattern. The circumference is labeled in degrees above the horizon. The graphs for different wavelengths do not have the same scale. Due to the lobes directed into the sky, monopoles longer than 0.625 wavelengths are almost never used as antennas.

Showing that due to its reflection (b), the monopole antenna (a) has the same radiation pattern over perfect ground as a dipole in free space (c) with the same current but twice the voltage

Vertical radiation patterns of three common length monopole mast radiator antennas over perfect ground. The distance of the line from the origin at a given elevation angle is proportional to the power density radiated at that angle. The horizontal gain increases from a quarter-wave (0.25$\lambda$) through a half-wave (0.5$\lambda$) to a maximum at five-eights wavelength (.625$\lambda$)

Like a vertical dipole antenna, a monopole has an omnidirectional radiation pattern: it radiates equal power in all azimuthal directions perpendicular to the antenna axis. The radiated power varies with elevation angle, with the radiation dropping off to zero at the zenith on the antenna axis. It radiates vertically polarized radio waves, with the electric field parallel to the element.

A monopole can be visualized (see diagram) as being formed by replacing the bottom half of a vertical dipole antenna (c) with a conducting plane (ground plane) at right-angles to the remaining half. If the ground plane is large enough, the radio waves from the remaining upper half of the dipole (a) reflected from the ground plane will seem to come from an image antenna (b) forming the missing half of the dipole, which adds to the direct radiation to form a dipole radiation pattern. So the pattern of a monopole over a perfectly conducting, infinite ground plane is identical to the top half of a dipole pattern.

See the gallery of radiation patterns. Up to a length of a half-wavelength (${\lambda \over 2}$) the radiation pattern has a single donut-shaped lobe with maximum radiated power in horizontal directions, perpendicular to the antenna axis. As the length is increased above ${\lambda \over 4}$ the lobe flattens, radiating less power at high angles and more in horizontal directions.

Above a half-wavelength the pattern splits into a horizontal main lobe and a small second conical lobe at an angle of 60° elevation into the sky. However the horizontal radiated power and gain keeps increasing and reaches a maximum at a length of five-eighths wavelength: ${5 \over 8}\lambda = .625\lambda$ (this is an approximation valid for a typical thickness antenna, for an infinitely thin monopole the maximum occurs at ${2 \over \pi}\lambda = .637\lambda$) The maximum occurs at this length because the opposite phase radiation from the two lobes interferes destructively and cancels at high angles, leaving more power to be radiated in horizontal directions.

Above $.625\lambda$ the high angle lobe gets larger, becoming the main lobe, and the horizontal lobe rapidly gets smaller, reducing power radiated in horizontal directions, so very few antennas use lengths above this. At the 4th harmonic, $h = \lambda$, the horizontal lobe disappears and all the power is radiated in the high angle lobe. As the antenna is made longer, the pattern divides into more lobes, with nulls (directions of zero radiated power) between them.

The general effect of electrically small ground planes, as well as imperfectly conducting earth grounds, is to tilt the direction of maximum radiation up to higher elevation angles and reduce the gain. When mounted on the Earth, due to the finite resistance of the soil the portion of the ground wave propagating horizontally in contact with the ground is attenuated exponentially and vanishes at long distances, so in the (far field) radiation pattern the radiated power declines smoothly to zero at the horizon (zero elevation angle).

With an asymmetrical ground plane, such as a whip antenna mounted on a car’s bumper, the pattern will no longer be omnidirectional, but will have stronger horizontal radiation on the side with the larger ground plane area.

=== Gain and input impedance ===
Characteristics of a thin monopole over perfect ground
Length $h$ wavelengths	Gain dBi	3 dB Beamwidth degrees (Note: This is the elevation angle above the horizon at which the radiated power drops to half maximum)	Radiation resistance ohms	
≪0.25	4.76	45°	$\approx 394(h / \lambda)^2$	electrically short
0.25	5.19	39°	36.5	fundamental
0.375	5.75	32°	92.8	
0.5	6.82	24°	>600	2nd harmonic
0.625	8.16	16°	53.2	maximum gain
0.75	(Note: The direction of maximum radiation at this and higher harmonics is not horizontal but directed at an angle into the sky)		52.7	3rd harmonic

Because it radiates only into the space above the ground plane, or half the space of a dipole antenna, a monopole antenna over a perfectly conducting infinite ground plane will have a gain of twice (3 dB greater than) the gain of a similar dipole antenna, and a radiation resistance half that of a dipole. Since a half-wave dipole has a gain of 2.19 dBi and a radiation resistance of 73.1 ohms, a quarter-wave ($\lambda/4$) monopole will have a gain of 2.19 + 3 = 5.19 dBi and a radiation resistance of about 36.5 ohms. The antenna is resonant at this length, so its input impedance is purely resistive. The input impedance has capacitive reactance below $\lambda/4$, inductive reactance from $\lambda/4$ to $\lambda/2$, and capacitive reactance from $\lambda/2$ to $3\lambda/4$.

The gain figures given in the table above are never approached in practice; they would only be achieved if the antenna was mounted over an infinite perfectly conducting ground plane. The ground plane is part of the antenna, and the gain is highly dependent on its size and conductivity. An artificial ground plane a wavelength or more in radius is equivalent to an infinite plane, but for smaller planes, which are often used at high frequencies, the gain will be 2 to 5 dBi lower, because some of the horizontal radiated power will diffract around the plane edge into the lower half space. Similarly over a resistive Earth ground the gain will be lower due to power absorbed in the Earth.

For electrically short monopoles below $\lambda/4$ the gain decreases slowly; it is 4.76 dBi at $\lambda/20$. As the length is increased to a half-wavelength ($\lambda/2$), the gain increases to about 1.7 dB over the $\lambda/4$ gain. Since at this length the antenna has a current node at its feedpoint, the input impedance is very high.

The gain continues to increase up to a maximum of about 3 dB over a quarter-wave monopole at a length of five-eighths wavelength ($.625\lambda$) so this is a popular length for ground wave antennas and terrestrial communication antennas. The radiation resistance drops to about 53 ohms at that length. Above $.625\lambda$ the horizontal gain drops rapidly because more power is radiated at high elevation angles in the second lobe.

=== Directivity equation ===
The reason a vertical monopole has an omnidirectional radiation pattern is that it is axially symmetrical about the vertical axis. The radiation pattern is given in spherical coordinates $r, \theta, \phi$, and due to this symmetry the pattern does not depend on the azimuth variable, $\phi$.

As mentioned, the radiation pattern of the monopole is the same as the top half of the dipole pattern. At any point above the ground plane the time average power density (Poynting vector) $\widehat{S}$ in watts per square meter of radio waves emitted by a monopole is twice that of a vertical dipole antenna $\widehat{S}_\text{d}$ of twice the length

$$\widehat{S} = 2\widehat{S}_\text{d}$$

Since for an electromagnetic wave in space $\widehat{S} = {E^2 \over 2\eta}$ the power density is proportional to the square of the electric field, therefore: $E = \sqrt{2}E_\text{d}$

For a radio antenna what is of interest is the radiation pattern in the far field region, far enough from the antenna so the induction fields have died out. The Fraunhofer diffraction equation below is accurate when $r \gg h$, $kr = {2 \pi r \over \lambda} \gg 1$ and $kh^2 \ll 4\pi r$, that is at distances from the antenna $r$ much greater than the element length and the wavelength. From the radiation pattern of a dipole given in the literature the far field electric field radiation pattern of a thin ($hk \ll 1$) monopole mounted over a perfectly conducting infinite ground plane is

$E(r, \theta) = {j\eta I_\text{0}e^{jkr} \over \sqrt{2}\pi r}\Bigg[{\cos(kh\sin \theta) - \cos kh \over \cos \theta}\Bigg]$

where

$h$ is the height of the element
$$k = {2\pi \over \lambda} = {2\pi f \over c}$$
$\eta$ is the impedance of free space, 376.74 ohms
$I_\text{0}$ is the feed current at the bottom of the antenna
$r$ is the distance from origin of the coordinate system at the base of the antenna to the reception point.
$\theta$ is the angle with respect to the positive z axis, the axis of the element. Since the ground plane reflects the radio waves, this equation only gives the radiation field for $0 \le \theta < \pi/2$ the field is zero for $\pi/2 \le \theta \le \pi$
$j = \sqrt{-1}$ is the imaginary unit

The electric field $E$ given by this equation is a phasor, a complex number with magnitude equal to the peak field and angle equal to the phase difference between the sinusoidal field and the input current. The presence of $j$ at the front of the equation means that the electric and magnetic fields leave the antenna 90° out of phase with the feed current.

The average power density in watts per square meter radiated by the monopole is

$\widehat{S}(r, \theta) = {\eta I_\text{0}^2 \over 4 \pi^2 r^2}\Bigg[{\cos(kh\sin \theta) - \cos kh \over \cos \theta}\Bigg]^2$

== Types of feed ==
Because in a resonant antenna the energy fed to the antenna by the transmitter each cycle is small compared to the energy stored in the standing wave on the antenna, the feed current can be applied at different points on the antenna without altering the current standing wave pattern much; leaving the radiation pattern the same. The advantage of this is that at different points on the antenna the input impedance has different values, allowing the possibility of impedance matching the antenna to the feedline characteristic impedance without a matching network, by choosing the correct feedpoint.

- Series or base feed - This is the most common type, the type discussed above, in which the feedline is connected between the base of the monopole and the ground plane. For the quarter-wave $\lambda/4$ monopole and odd harmonics the input impedance is a minimum, 36.8 ohms for a quarter-wave monopole. For the half-wave $\lambda/2$ monopole, the impedance is very high, requiring a matching transformer.
- Shunt feed - One side of the feedline is connected to ground, and the other to a point along the antenna element, and the base of the element is grounded. The part of the element between the feedpoint and ground acts as a shorted stub. Since the impedance is zero at the base and increases continuously to a very high value, 800 - 4000 ohms at a height of $\lambda/4$, any input impedance between these values can be realized by choosing the correct feed height on the element.

- Gamma match - a shunt feed with a capacitor in the feedline connecting to the element.

- Folded monopole - A monopole can also be fed at the top, by grounding the base of the element, mounting a parallel conductor next to it, attached at the top, and feeding this conductor at the bottom. Because of their proximity the two elements are coupled so the current and voltage are the same in each. The folded monopole has a radiation resistance of 4 times the base fed monopole.

== Electrically short monopoles ==
A monopole shorter than the fundamental resonance length of a quarter-wavelength at its operating frequency is called electrically short. Electrically short monopoles are widely used since they are more compact, and at long wavelengths construction limitations make it impractical to build an antenna mast a quarter wavelength high. Even a very short rod a small fraction of a wavelength long can be impedance matched to a transmitter so it absorbs all the power from the feedline. However as the length is decreased the antenna eventually becomes inefficient due to its low radiation resistance.

Below a quarter wavelength the radiation resistance of a monopole decreases approximately with the square of the ratio of length to wavelength

$R_\text{R} \approx {\eta\pi \over 3}\Big({h \over \lambda}\Big)^2 = (394 \text{Ω}) \Big({h \over \lambda}\Big)^2 \qquad h \ll {\lambda \over 4}$

The radiation resistance is only part of the feedpoint resistance at the antenna terminals. A monopole and its feed system have other power losses which appear as additional resistance in series with the radiation resistance at the transmitter terminals; ohmic resistance of the metal antenna elements, dielectric losses in insulating materials, feedline losses, losses in the loading coil necessary for impedance matching, and particularly resistive losses in the Earth ground system, often the largest loss factor in low frequency monopoles. The total feedpoint resistance $R_\text{IN}$ seen by the transmitter is equal to the sum of the radiation resistance $R_\text{R}$ and loss resistance $R_\text{L}$

$$R_\text{IN} = R_\text{R} + R_\text{L}$$

The power $P_\text{IN}$ fed to the antenna is split proportionally between these two resistances. From Joule's law

$$P_\text{IN} = I_\text{IN}^2 R_\text{IN}$$
$$P_\text{IN} = I_\text{IN}^2 (R_\text{R} + R_\text{L})$$
$$P_\text{IN} = P_\text{R} + P_\text{L}$$

where

$P_\text{R} = I_\text{IN}^2 R_\text{R} = {\eta\pi \over 3}\Big({hI_\text{IN} \over \lambda}\Big)^2\quad$ and $\quad P_\text{L} = I_\text{IN}^2 R_\text{L}$

The power $P_\text{R}$ consumed by radiation resistance is converted to radio waves, the desired function of the antenna, while the power $P_\text{L}$ consumed by loss resistance is converted to heat, representing a waste of transmitter power. So for minimum power loss it is desirable that the radiation resistance be much greater than the loss resistance. The ratio of the radiation resistance to the total feedpoint resistance is equal to the efficiency $e_\text{A}$ of the antenna as a transducer

$$e_\text{A} = {P_\text{R} \over P_\text{IN}} = {R_\text{R} \over R_\text{R} + R_\text{L}}$$

As the monopole is made shorter it's radiation resistance decreases and a greater proportion of the transmitter power is dissipated in the loss resistance. Base-fed mast radiator antennas shorter than about .16 wavelength are not used, as the radiation resistance at that length is around 10 ohms, 5 times the typical resistance of a buried radial ground system, 2 ohms, so in an Earth-grounded antenna over 20% of the transmitter power would be wasted in the ground resistance. In the VLF band the huge top-loaded wire monopoles used by megawatt military transmitters are often less than 0.01 wavelengths high and have radiation resistance of less than 0.1 ohm. Even with extremely low resistance ground systems they are often only 15% to 30% efficient.

Another disadvantage of electrically short monopoles is that as the antenna is made shorter and the radiation resistance decreases, the capacitance decreases and so the capacitive reactance increases. The low resistance in combination with the capacitance of the antenna and inductance of the required loading coil gives the antenna a large Q factor; this means it has a narrow bandwidth, which reduces the data rate that can be transmitted or received. Antennas in the VLF band often have a bandwidth of only 50 to 100 hertz. The Chu-Harrington limit gives the minimum Q factor for a small antenna.

=== Capacitively top-loaded monopoles ===
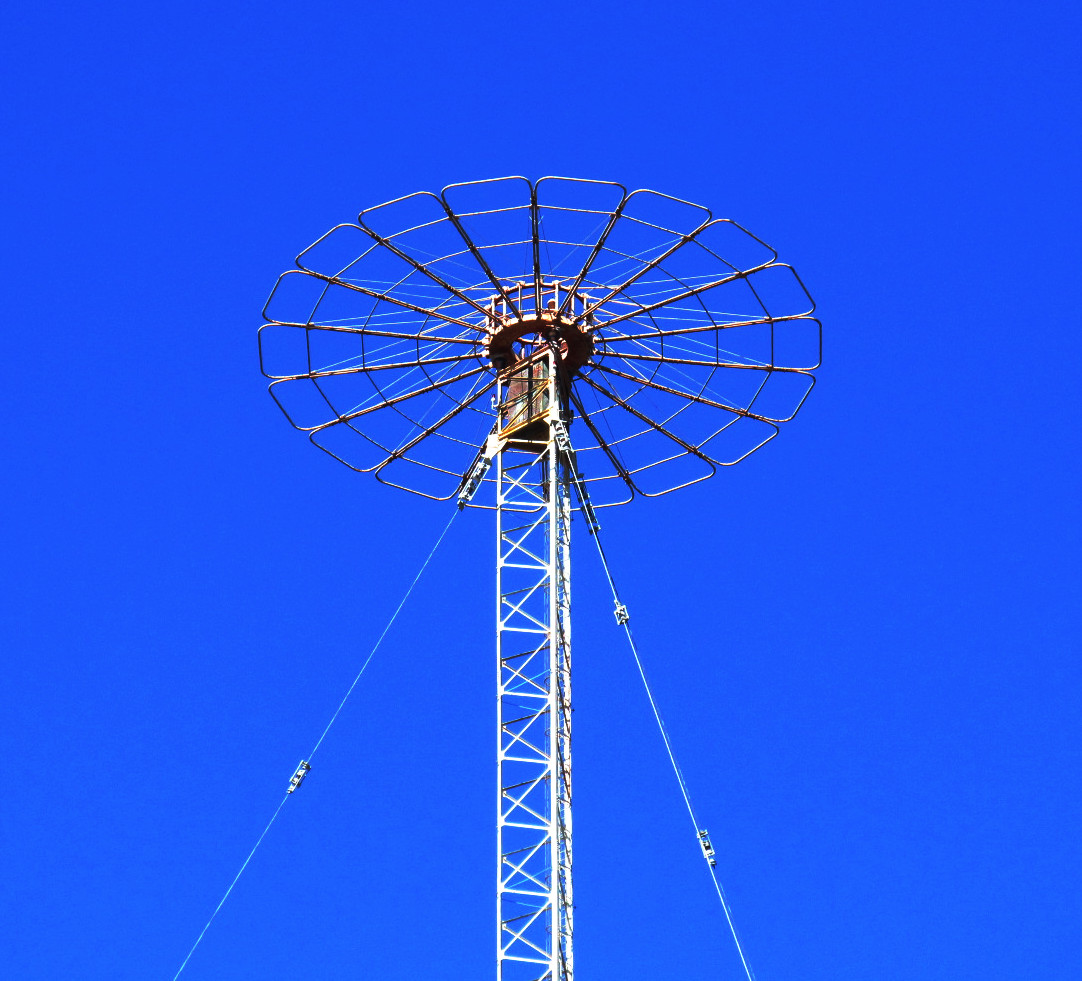
Capacitive "top hat" on mast of AM radio tower in Hamersley, Australia

To increase the radiated power of an electrically short monopole, capacitance to ground can be added to the top by attaching horizontal metal conductors, insulated from ground, to the top of the element. This is called a top loaded monopole. This results in increased current in the vertical monopole element, to charge and discharge the capacitance each cycle. Since the power radiated by a monopole is proportional to the square of the current in the radiating element, this increases the radiated power and thus the radiation resistance. The buried radial wire ground system under the antenna serves as the bottom plate of the 'capacitor'.

Mast radiators sometimes include a circular structure of radial rods at the top of the mast; this is called a 'top hat'. At lower frequencies in the LF and VLF bands larger top loads are used. The T antenna consists of a vertical wire driven at the bottom, rising to attach to the center of a horizontal top load wire insulated at both ends, supported by masts. Multiple parallel top load wires can be used to increase capacitance. The largest top loaded antenna is the umbrella antenna, consisting of a monopole mast radiator with many diagonal top load wires radiating symmetrically from the top, anchored to the ground through insulators. To tune out the high capacitive reactance and make the antenna resonant a large loading coil is required in series with the feedline at the base of the antenna.

At low frequencies, due to the high capacitance and low radiation resistance, the top loaded monopole has a very narrow bandwidth. This may limit the width of sidebands and thus the data rate that can be transmitted. High power transmitting antennas in the VLF band typically have $Q$ of several hundred and bandwidths less than 100 Hz. The energy stored in the antenna, stored alternately as an electrostatic field in the top load and a magnetic field in the loading coil, is hundreds of times the energy input from the transmitter each cycle. The voltage at the ends of the top-load wires is very high, $Q$ times the feed voltage, and may be hundreds of kilovolts, requiring very good insulation. The antenna must be tuned to resonance with the transmitter using a variometer coil.

== Definition of variables ==
Symbol	Unit	Definition
$\alpha$	[none]	element length-to-diameter ratio $h/2b$
$\eta$	ohm (Ω)	Impedance of free space = $\sqrt{\mu_\text{0}/\epsilon_\text{0}}$ = 376.73 ohms
$\Phi$	radian	Phase shift of antenna current during round trip along element
$\phi$	radian	azimuth angle of spherical coordinate system
$\lambda$	meter (m)	Free space wavelength of radio waves
$\pi$	[none]	Math constant ≈ 3.1416
$\theta$	radian	angle from vertical axis in spherical coordinate system
$b$	meter (m)	radius of monopole element
$c$	meters per second (ms^{−1})	Velocity of light
$e$	[none]	Base of natural logarithms = 2.71828
$e_\text{A}$	[none]	Efficiency of the antenna
$f$	hertz (Hz)	Frequency of radio waves
$f_\mathsf{n}$	hertz (Hz)	Resonant frequencies of monopole
$G$	[none]	Electrical length, length in wavelengths, of the monopole element
$h$	meter (m)	length of monopole element
$i_\mathsf{up}(z,t)$	ampere (A)	Upward current wave on antenna element at elevation z and time t
$i_\mathsf{down}(z,t)$	ampere (A)	Downward current wave on antenna element at elevation z and time t
$I (z)$	ampere (A)	Standing wave current on antenna element at elevation z
$I_\mathsf{IN}$	ampere (A)	RMS current into antenna terminals
$I_\mathsf{0}$	ampere (A)	Maximum RMS current in antenna element
$I_\mathsf{1}$	ampere (A)	RMS current at an arbitrary point in antenna element
$j$	[none]	imaginary unit $\sqrt{-1}$
$k$	meter^{−1}	Angular wavenumber $= 2\pi/\lambda$
$P_\mathsf{IN}$	watt (W)	Electric power delivered to antenna terminals
$P_\mathsf{R}$	watt (W)	Power radiated as radio waves by antenna
$P_\mathsf{L}$	watt (W)	Power consumed in loss resistances of antenna
$Q$	[none]	Q factor of antenna, the resonant frequency divided by bandwidth
$r$	meters	Distance from the origin at the base of the element to the observation point
$R_\mathsf{R}$	ohm (Ω)	Radiation resistance of antenna
$R_\mathsf{L}$	ohm (Ω)	Equivalent loss resistance of antenna at input terminals
$R_\mathsf{IN}$	ohm (Ω)	Input resistance of antenna
$R_\mathsf{R0}$	ohm (Ω)	Radiation resistance at point of maximum current in antenna
$R_\mathsf{R1}$	ohm (Ω)	Radiation resistance at arbitrary point in antenna
$\widehat{S}(r, \theta)$	watts per square meter	power density averaged over a cycle radiated by the antenna in the direction $r, \theta$
$\widehat{S}_\text{d}$	watts per square meter	power density radiated by a dipole antenna twice the height
$t$	second (s)	Time
$X_\mathsf{R}$	ohm (Ω)	Input reactance of antenna
$z$	meter (m)	Height on monopole element above lower end

== See also ==
- Antenna types
- Dual-band blade antenna
- Electrical lengthening
- Signal strength
