= Folded unipole antenna =

Antenna used for radio broadcasts

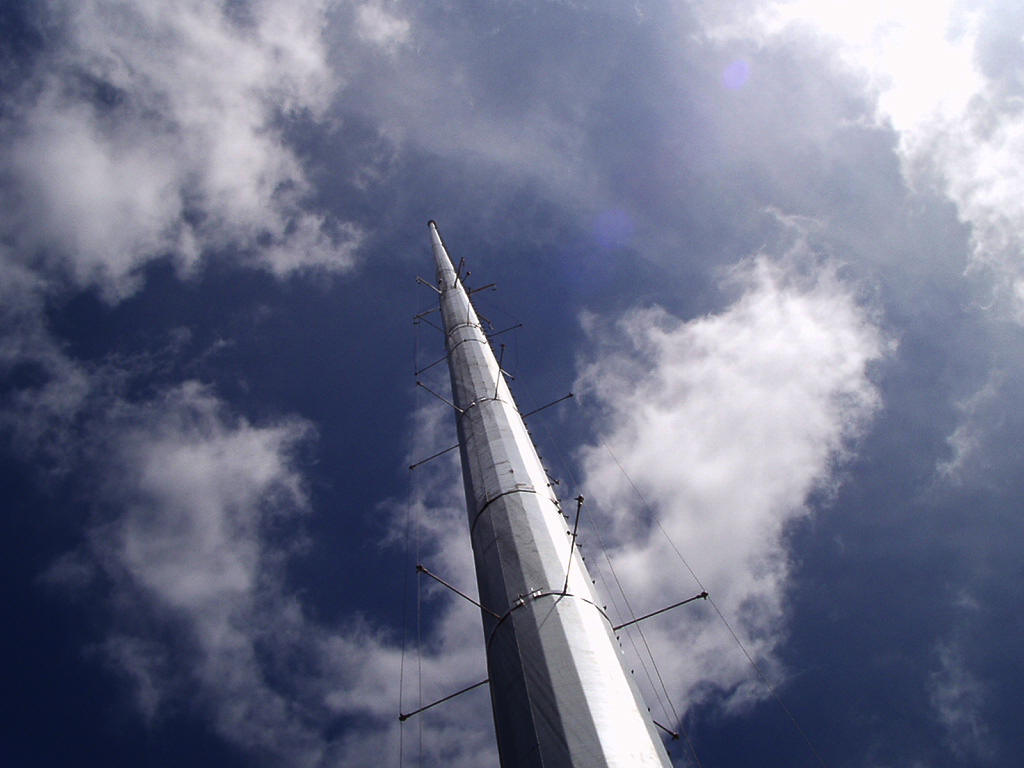
Modern folded unipole antenna with six skirt wires surrounding a round solid metal mast. The skirt wires are held away from the mast by stand-off posts with insulated ends.

The folded unipole antenna is a type of monopole mast radiator antenna used as a transmitting antenna mainly in the medium wave band for AM radio broadcasting stations. It consists of a vertical metal rod or mast mounted over and connected at its base to a grounding system consisting of buried wires. The mast is surrounded by a "skirt" of vertical wires electrically attached at or near the top of the mast. The skirt wires are connected by a metal ring near the mast base, and the feedline feeding power from the transmitter is connected between the ring and the ground.

It has seen much use for refurbishing medium wave AM broadcasting station towers in the United States and other countries. When an AM radio station shares a tower with other antennas such as FM broadcasting antennas, the folded unipole is often a good choice. Since the base of the tower connects to the ground system, unlike in an ordinary mast radiator tower in which the base is at high voltage, the transmission lines to any antennas mounted on the tower, as well as aircraft lighting power lines, can be run up the side of the tower without requiring isolators.

== Invention ==
The folded unipole antenna was first devised for broadcast use by John H. Mullaney, an American radio broadcast pioneer, and consulting engineer. It was designed to solve some difficult problems with existing medium wave (MW), frequency modulation (FM), and amplitude modulation (AM) broadcast antenna installations.

== Typical installation ==
Folded unipole with only three skirt wires mounted off the corners of a standard triangular frame mast. (The close-in wire on the left side of the image is an incidental guy wire in the foreground.)

Since folded unipoles are most often used for refurbishing old broadcast antennas, the first subsection below describes a typical monopole antenna used as a starting point. The subsection that follows next describes how surrounding skirt wires are added to convert an ordinary broadcast tower into a folded unipole.

The picture at the right shows a small folded unipole antenna constructed from an existing triangular monopole tower; it has only three vertical wires comprising its "skirt".

=== Conventional monopole antennas ===
A typical monopole transmitting antenna for an AM radio station is a series-fed mast radiator; a vertical steel lattice mast which is energized and radiates radio waves. One side of the feedline which feeds power from the transmitter to the antenna is connected to the mast, the other side to a ground (electricity) system consisting of buried wires radiating from a terminal next to the base of the mast. The mast is supported on a thick ceramic insulator which isolates it electrically from the ground. US FCC regulations require the ground system to have 120 buried copper or phosphor bronze radial wires at least one-quarter wavelength long; there is usually a ground-screen in the immediate vicinity of the tower. To minimize corrosion, all the ground system components are bonded together, usually by using brazing or soldered with coin silver.

The mast has diagonal guy cables attached to it, anchored to concrete anchors in the ground, to support it. The guy lines have strain insulators in them to isolate them electrically from the mast, to prevent the high voltage from reaching the ground. To prevent the conductive guy lines from disturbing the radiation pattern of the antenna, additional strain insulators are sometimes inserted in the lines to divide them into a series of short, electrically separate segments, to ensure all segments are too short to resonate at the operating frequency.

In the U.S., the Federal Communications Commission (FCC) requires that the transmitter power measurements for a single series-fed tower calculated at this feed point as the current squared multiplied by the resistive part of the feed-point impedance:
$$P = I^2 R.$$

Electrically short monopole antennas have low resistance and high capacitive (negative) reactance. Depending on desired recipients and the surrounding terrain, and particularly depending on locations of spacious expanses of open water, a longer antenna may tend to send signals out in directions that are increasingly more advantageous, up to the point that the antenna's electrical height exceeds about 5/8 wavelengths tall.

Reactance is zero only for towers slightly shorter than 1/4 wavelength, but the reactance will in any case rise or fall depending on humidity, dust, salty spume, or ice collecting on the tower or its feedline. Regardless of its height, the antenna feed system has an impedance matching system housed in a small shed at the tower's base (called a "tuning hut" or "coupling hut" or "helix hut"). The matching network is adjusted to join the antenna's impedance to the characteristic impedance of the feedline joining it to the transmitter. If the tower is too short (or too tall) for the frequency, the antenna's capacitive (or inductive) reactance will be cancelled out with the opposite reactance by the matching network, as well as raising or lowering the feedpoint resistance of the antenna to match the feedline's characteristic impedance. The combined limitations of the matching network, ground wires, and tower can cause the system to have a narrow bandwidth; in extreme cases the effects of narrow bandwidth can be severe enough to detract from the audio fidelity of the radio broadcast.

Electrically short antennas have low radiation resistance, which makes normal loss in other parts of the system relatively more costly in terms of lost broadcast power. The losses in the ground system, matching network(s), feedline wires, and structure of the tower all are in series with the antenna feed current, and each wastes a share of the broadcast power heating the soil or metal in the tower.

=== Folded unipole antennas ===
Heuristically, the unipole's outer skirt wires can be thought of as attached segments of several tall, narrow, single-turn coils, all wired in parallel, with the central mast completing the final side of each turn. Equivalently, each skirt wire makes a parallel wire stub, with the mast being the other parallel "wire"; the closed end at the top of the stub, where the skirt connects to the mast, makes a transmission line stub inductor. Either way of looking at it, the effect of the skirt wires is to add inductive reactance to the antenna mast, which helps neutralize a short mast's capacitive reactance.

For the normal case of a short monopole, the inductive reactance introduced by the skirt wires decreases as the frequency decreases and the bare mast's capacitive reactance increases. With increasing frequency, up to frequency where the skirt is a quarter wavelength, the inductive reactance rises and capacitive reactance drops. So for a short antenna, the skirt's inductance and the mast's capacitance can only cancel at a single frequency, since the reactance magnitudes increase and decrease in opposite manner with frequency.

With a longer antenna mast, at least a quarter-wave tall, the reactances can be more elaborately configured: The contrary reactances can be made to cancel each other at more than one frequency, at least in part, and to rise and fall by approximately the same amount. Approximate balance between the opposing reactances adds up to reduce the total reactance of the whole antenna at the decreased (and increased) frequencies, thus widening the antenna's low-reactance bandwidth. (Note: Some proponents make additional performance claims about the resulting composite antenna allowing removal of almost all of the reactance only by design of the unipole, without the need for a separate tuning network.) However, there is nothing particularly remarkable about a longer antenna having a wider low-reactance bandwidth.

If the greater part of the unbalanced radio current can be made to flow in the skirt wires, instead of in the mast, the outer ring of skirt wires will also effectively add electrical width to the mast, which also will improve bandwidth by causing the unbalanced currents in the unipole to function like a "cage antenna".

Modern folded unipole feed point, where the radio frequency excitation current will be measured. The connection ring that attaches to the skirt wires is a simple loop of fairly thin wire cutting across the top edge of the image. The stout vertical bars tighten the skirt: Near the top of the picture, the bars' connections to the skirt wires are insulated; their other ends fasten to the support truss anchored on the ground, near the bottom of the image.

Usually folded-unipoles are constructed by modifying an existing monopole antenna, and not all possible unipole improvements can be achieved on every monopole.

- First one connects the base of the tower directly to the ground system by shorting out the base insulator (if any).
- Then a series of vertical wires – typically four to eight – are installed from an attachment at or near the top of the tower; these wires surround the tower and are called a "skirt".
- The skirt wires are kept a constant distance from the tower by insulated "stand-off" structural members, and joined to an electrically isolated conductor ring that surrounds the base of the tower, also mounted on insulated stand-offs.
- The new antenna feed connects between the common point of the ground system and the ring at the bottom of the skirt wires.

The resulting skirt enveloping the mast connects only at the tower top, or some midpoint near the top, and to the isolated conducting ring that surrounds the tower base; the skirt wires remain insulated from the mast at every other point along its entire length.

== Unipole electrical operation and design ==
Balanced and unbalanced currents are important for understanding antennas, because unbalanced current always radiates, and close-spaced balanced current never radiates. The following sketch of how a unipole antenna works separately considers the balanced and unbalanced currents flowing through the antenna. The sum of the two is the actual current seen in any one conductor.

=== Total current broken into balanced and unbalanced parts ===
By the electrical superposition principle, the total currents flowing in the antenna can be considered as split into the sum of independent balanced and unbalanced currents. The balanced and unbalanced parts of the antenna's currents add to make the "true" current profile; equivalently, if we call the "true" current measured flowing through the mast $I_\text{mast},$ and $I_\text{skirt}$ the sum of all the "true" currents measured in the skirt wires (by symmetry assumed to all be the same), then the balanced and unbalanced parts of the "true" currents are
$$\begin{align}
I_\text{balnc} &= \tfrac{1}{2} (I_\text{mast} - I_\text{skirt}), \\
I_\text{unbal} &= \tfrac{1}{2} (I_\text{mast} + I_\text{skirt}).
\end{align}$$

Going the other way, the "true" currents in the mast and skirt, from the conceptual balanced and unbalanced currents are
$$\begin{align}
I_\text{mast} &= I_\text{unbal} + I_\text{balnc}, \\
I_\text{skirt} &= I_\text{unbal} - I_\text{balnc}.
\end{align}$$

So as an example, from a simplified point of view, the distinction between an antenna and its feedline is that the balanced current flows anti-parallel in the feedline, which does not radiate, and is rechanneled into unbalanced, vector parallel paths inside the antenna, which do radiate.

=== Balanced feed current ===
The electrical behavior of the skirt and mast can be thought of as similar to a coaxial feedline, with the skirt corresponding to the coax's outer shield, and the mast serving as the core wire, or center conductor. The connection of the skirt and mast at the top acts as a short at the end of the virtual coax, and because the "coax" is, by design, less than a quarter wave long at the attachment point it is effectively an inductive shorted stub. Regardless of the configured skirt and mast sizes and spacing, which determine the impedance seen by the balanced current, the feed current circulating through the skirt and the mast produce a voltage difference between the top and the skirt feed point and between the top and ground plane which is half of the voltage difference between the feedpoint and the ground (possibly with exceedingly minor variations).

The only current considered so-far is balanced: The same total feed current rises up the skirt wires as flows down through the mast to the ground-level feedpoint (or vice versa), and back through the (balanced) feedline, making an electrically closed circuit. The magnetic fields of the current flowing up are equal and opposite to the current flowing down, so the magnetic fields (very nearly) all cancel, and consequently balanced currents (mostly) do not radiate. So the situation on the antenna after considering just the balanced feed current is that it creates a voltage difference between the antenna top and the ground plane, and nothing in terms of radio waves. That voltage difference serves as an electrical exciter of an unbalanced current.

=== Unbalanced radiating current ===
If one then considers separately the antenna from the "point of view" of any prospective unbalanced current, it sees an unbalanced voltage between the connection point near the top of the mast and the ground plane at the antenna base. (For RF analysis, the backwards path through the feedpoint to the radio is treated as a virtual path to ground, ignoring the balanced feed current.) The self-cancelled balanced currents won't electrically affect the unbalanced currents (other than having created the voltage difference in common to all), although they do add to make the "true" current profile in the antenna.

There are two possible paths that unbalanced current can take in response to the voltage difference between the top and the bottom: Either down (or up) through the mast, or down (or up) through the skirt wires. Because the currents along each path are driven by the same voltage, they will flow in the same direction. The current divides in proportion to the admittance (reciprocal impedance) of each path to ground. The amount of current along each path is determined by the sizes and number of the wire(s) along each path, and to some extent the mutual impedance of the adjacent conductors (mast and skirt wires) and the currents flowing in those wires (parallel currents in adjoining wires crowd out each other's magnetic fields, making it harder to push the current through). All unbalanced current radiates; the radiation from the several vector-parallel current paths all add.

=== Design choices and results ===
Compared to balanced currents through the same two conductors, the electrical impedance countering the flow of unbalanced currents is very high – roughly 500–600 Ω and higher, depending mostly on the wire diameter, but also rising with closer or larger parallel currents in adjacent wires. The impedance against the flow of balanced currents is roughly 300–500 Ω and lower, depending mostly on the spacing between the wires, dropping when wires are more closely spaced. Consequently, the flow of balanced current tends to be larger in magnitude than its unbalanced counterpart, and the difference becomes greater the closer the conductors are spaced.

The electrical design of a unipole antenna lies in choosing the sizes and number of the skirt wires, their lengths, and (if possible) the size of the central mast, in order to adjust the relative impedances (or admittances) of the balanced and unbalanced current, in order to maximize radiation and to present a reactance-free balanced feedpoint impedance for the feedline. (Other design considerations, like cost of materials and ease of erection, may lead to choices sub-optimal for electrical performance.)

Because of the large number of free design parameters, compared to other antenna types, an exceedingly diverse variety of different unipole antennas can be made, and their performance will all be different. Unlike a commonly used antenna such as the simple doublet, there is no "typical unipole" performance figure. That being said, however, field testing discussed below shows that when just considering antenna efficiency, the power radiated per power fed to a unipole is very nearly the same as an ordinary monopole antenna with the same height: Other than the advantage of being able to tailor the feedpoint impedance, there appears to be no inherent superior performance for unipoles compared to basic monopoles. The only unipole design advantage boils down to it having an elaborately configurable, built-in impedance-matching system.

== Performance comparisons ==
When a well-made folded-unipole replaces a decrepit antenna, or one with a poor original design, there will of course be an improvement in performance; the sudden improvement may be cause for mistakenly inferred superiority in the design.

Experiments show that folded-unipole performance is the same as other monopole designs: Direct comparisons between folded unipoles and more conventional vertical antennas of the same height, all well-made, and with nearly equivalent radiator widths, show essentially no difference in radiation pattern in actual measurements by Rackley et al. (1996) and by Cox & Moser (2002).

The expected wider bandwidth was also not found during antenna range tests of several folded unipoles.

=== Replaced shunt-fed antenna ===
Most commonly, folded-unipole designs were used to replace a shunt-fed antenna – a different broadcast antenna design that also has a grounded base. A "shunt-fed" (or "slant-wire") antenna comprises a grounded tower with the top of a sloping single-wire feed-line attached at a point on the mast that results in an approximate match to the impedance desired at the other end of the sloping feed-wire. (Note: The point on the mast is almost always chosen to be slightly inductive, so that a series capacitor (low-loss) can tune out the remaining reactance on the feed-line.) (Note: When the feed wire drops parallel to the radiating element, instead of sloping away, the configuration is called a gamma match or gamma feed.)

If a well-made folded-unipole antenna replaced an aged-out slant-fed antenna, station engineers could notice a marked improvement in performance. Such improvements may have provoked conjectures that folded-unipole antennas had power gains, or other wonderful characteristics, but those suppositions are not borne out by radio engineering calculations, nor field tests.

=== Ground system maintenance ===
Sites of ground-mounted monopole antennas require landscape maintenance: Keeping weeds and grass covering the antenna's ground plane wires as short as possible, since green plants in between the antenna tower and the antenna ground system will dissipate power of the radio waves passing through them, reducing antenna efficiency. Folded-unipole antenna sites were alleged to be less affected by weeds and long grass on top of the ground wires that cause attenuation in other monopole antenna designs, but measurements show no such advantage.

== Self-resonant unipole patents ==
A possible improvement over the basic folded-unipole antenna is the "self resonant" unipole antenna, described in U.S. patent 6,133,890. (Note: U.S. patent 6,133,890 abstract: A self-resonant vertically polarized folded unipole antenna for long wave (LW) [and] medium wave (MW) broadcasting, and for the 160 meter amateur radio band with a grounded tower connected to radially descending fold wires terminated near the base of the tower in an open polygonal ring, possibly a C-ring with a reactive load in series with this ring. This reactance cancels the reactive component of the antenna input impedance causing the input impedance to appear resistive at the feed point. This leads to outstanding linearity and bandwidth up to and possibly exceeding plus or minus 16 kHz, sometimes exceeding plus and minus 20 kHz.)

Another possible improvement to the folded unipole is described in U.S. patent 4,658,266, which concerns a more carefully designed form of ground plane for use with all monopole types (only incidentally including folded unipoles).

== See also ==
- Driven element
