= Mast radiator =

Type of radio frequency antenna

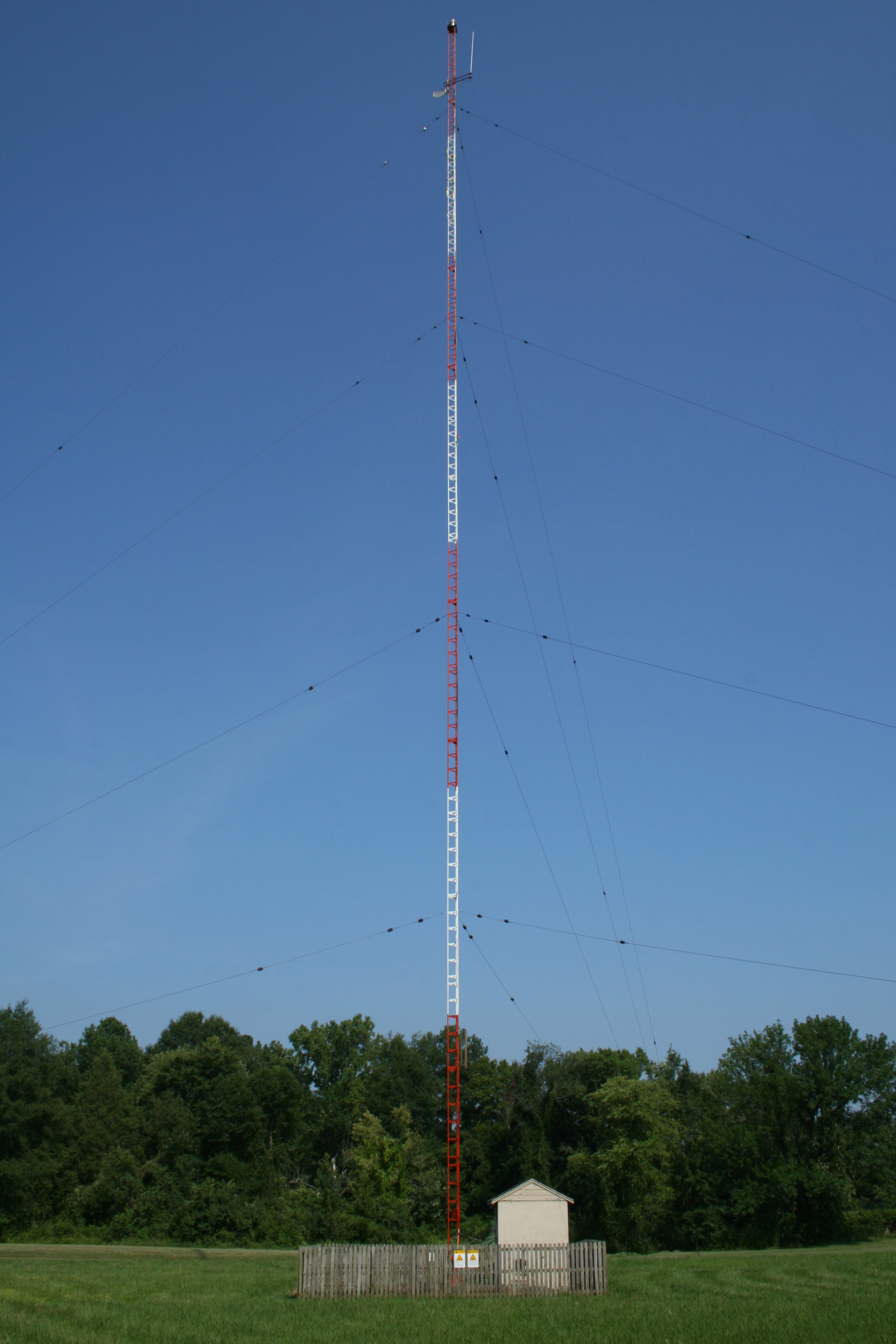
A typical mast radiator and antenna tuning hut of an AM radio station in Chapel Hill, North Carolina, U.S.

A mast radiator (or radiating tower) is a radio mast or tower in which the metal structure itself is energized and functions as an antenna. This design, first used widely in the 1930s, is commonly used for transmitting antennas operating at low frequencies, in the LF and MF bands, in particular those used for AM radio broadcasting stations. The conductive steel mast is electrically connected to the transmitter. Its base is usually mounted on a nonconductive support to insulate it from the ground. A mast radiator is a form of monopole antenna.

== Structural design ==
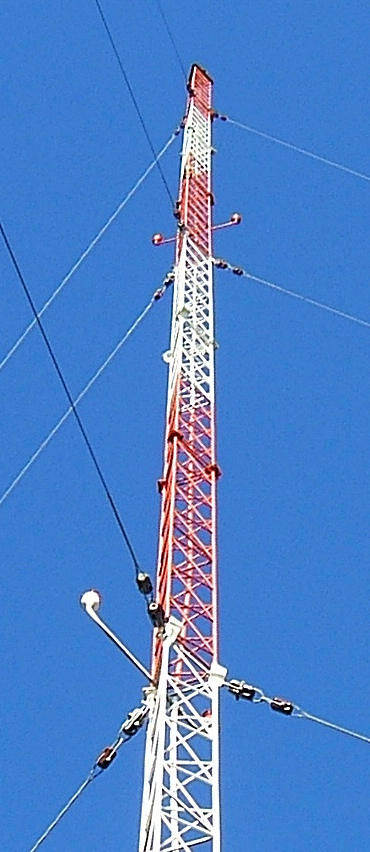
Typical 60-meter (200 ft) triangular guyed lattice mast of an AM radio station in Mount Vernon, Washington, US

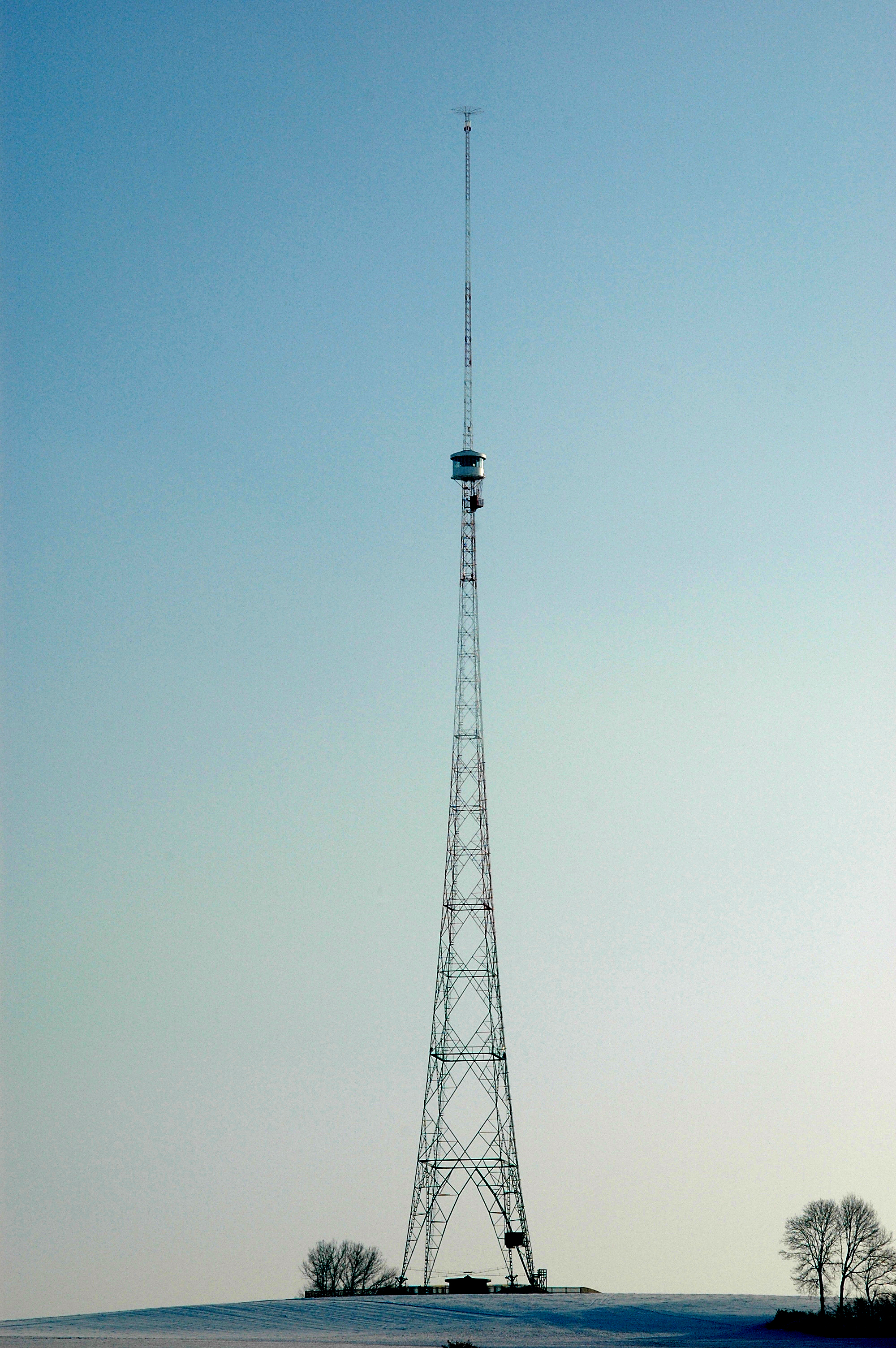
The Blosenbergturm, a freestanding tower antenna in Beromünster, Switzerland

Most mast radiators are built as guyed masts. Steel lattice masts of triangular cross-section are the most common type. Square lattice masts and tubular masts are also sometimes used. To ensure that the tower is a continuous conductor, the tower's structural sections are electrically bonded at the joints by short copper jumpers which are soldered to each side or "fusion" (arc) welds across the mating flanges.

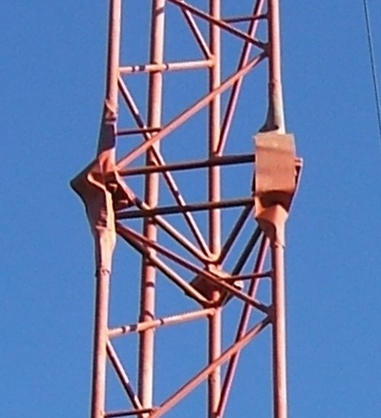
To ensure that the mast acts as a single conductor, the separate structural sections of the mast are connected electrically by copper jumpers.

Base-fed masts, the most common type, must be insulated from the ground. At its base, the mast is usually mounted on a thick ceramic insulator, which has the compressive strength to support the tower's weight and the dielectric strength to withstand the high voltage applied by the transmitter. The RF power to drive the antenna is supplied by a impedance matching network, usually housed in an antenna tuning hut near the base of the mast, and the cable supplying the current is simply bolted or brazed to the tower. The actual transmitter is usually located in a separate building, which supplies RF power to the tuning hut via a transmission line.

To keep it upright the mast has tensioned guy wires attached, usually in sets of 3 at 120° angles, which are anchored to the ground usually with concrete anchors. Multiple sets of guys (from 2 to 5) at different levels are used to make the tower rigid against buckling. The guy lines have strain insulators inserted, usually at the top near the attachment point to the mast, to insulate the conductive cable from the mast, preventing the high voltage on the tower from reaching the ground.

Even though they are insulated from the mast the conductive guy cables can act electrically as resonant antennas (parasitic elements), absorbing and reradiating radio waves from the mast, disturbing the radiation pattern of the antenna. To prevent this, additional strain insulators are inserted at intervals in the guy cables to divide the line into nonresonant lengths: Usually segments should be limited to a maximum of one-eighth to one-tenth wavelength ($\ \tfrac{\ 1\ }{ 8 } \lambda \sim \tfrac{ 1 }{\ 10\ } \lambda\$).

Mast radiators can also be built as free-standing lattice towers, wide at the bottom for stability, narrowing to a slender mast. The advantage of this construction is the elimination of guy lines and thus reduction in land area required. These towers can have a triangular or a square cross section, with each leg supported on an insulator. A disadvantage is the wide base of the tower distorts the vertical current pattern on the tower, reducing the radiation resistance and therefore the radiated power, so guyed masts are preferred.

A country's national radio ministry usually has regulatory authority over the design and operation of radio masts, in addition to local building codes which cover structural design. In the US this is the Federal Communications Commission (FCC). Plans for a mast must be approved by regulators before building.

== Electrical design ==
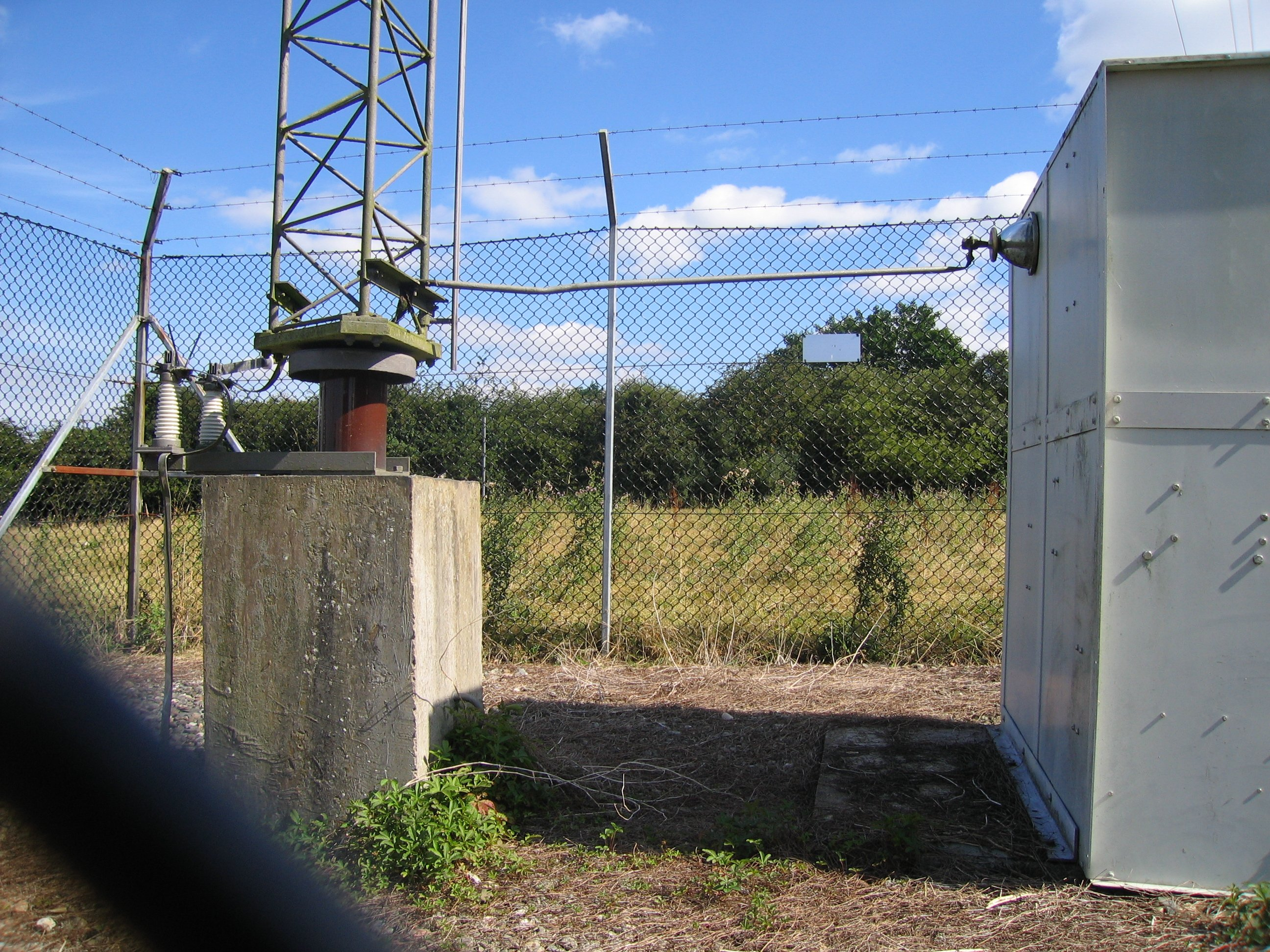
Base feed: Radio frequency power is fed to the mast by a wire attached to it, which comes from a matching network inside the "antenna tuning hut" at right. The brown ceramic insulator at the base keeps the mast electrically insulated from the ground. On the left there is an earthing switch and a spark gap for lightning protection.

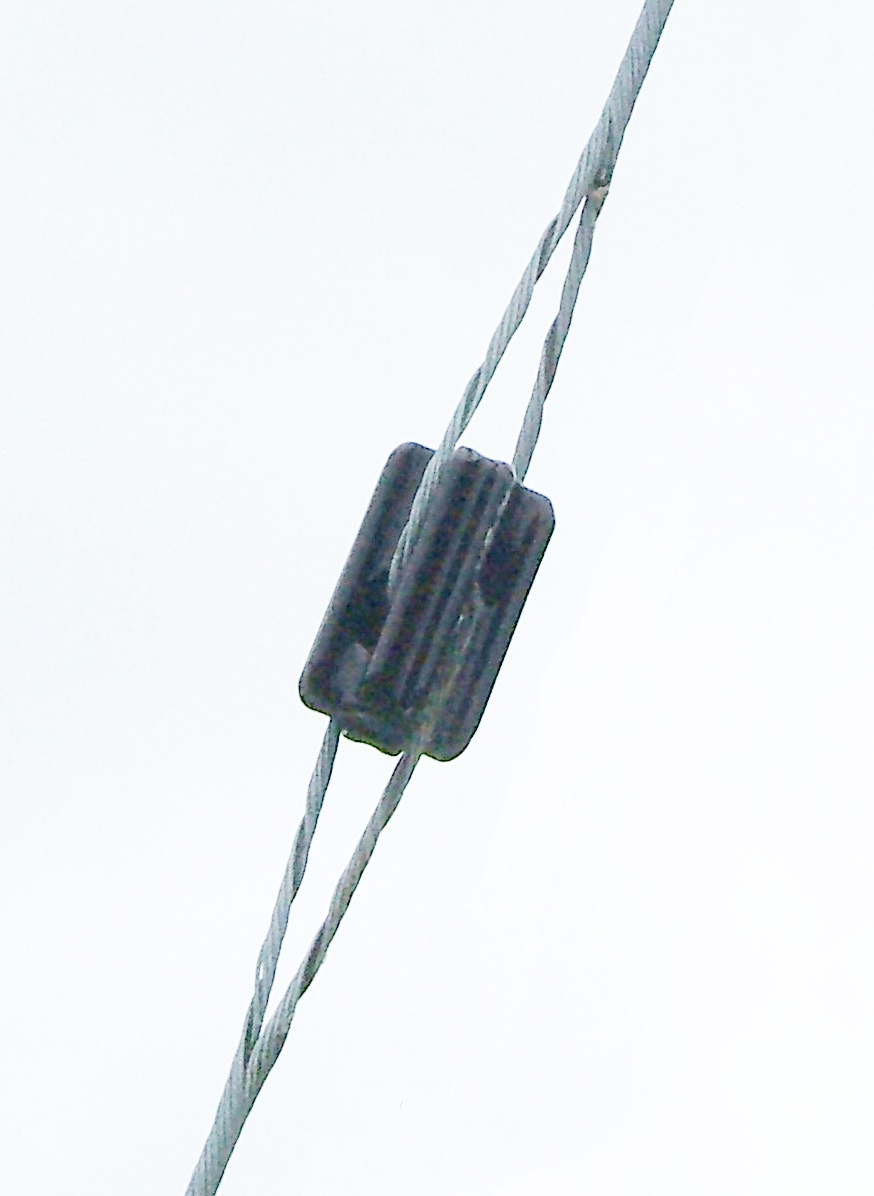
Guy lines have strain insulators inserted to prevent the high voltage on the mast from reaching the ground, and to break the lines into segments with non-resonant lengths.

A single mast radiator is an omnidirectional antenna which radiates equal radio wave power in all horizontal directions. Mast radiators radiate vertically polarized radio waves, with most of the power emitted at low elevation angles. In the medium frequency (MF) and low frequency (LF) bands AM radio stations cover their listening area using ground waves, vertically polarized radio waves which travel close to the ground surface, following the contour of the terrain. Mast radiators make good ground wave antennas, and are the main type of transmitting antennas used by AM radio stations, as well as other radio services in the MF and LF bands. They also can radiate enough power at higher elevation angles for skywave (skip) radio transmission.

Most radio stations use single masts. Multiple masts fed with radio current at different phases can be used to construct directional antennas, which radiate more power in specific directions than others.

=== Feed system ===
The transmitter which generates the radio frequency current is often located in a building a short distance away from the mast, so its sensitive electronics and operating personnel will not be exposed to the strong radio waves at the base of the mast. Alternatively it is sometimes located at the base of the mast, with the transmitter room surrounded by a Faraday shield of copper screen to keep radio waves out. The current from the transmitter is delivered to the mast through a feedline, a specialized cable (transmission line) for carrying radio frequency current. At LF and MF frequencies foam insulated coaxial cable is usually used. The feedline is connected to an antenna tuning unit (impedance matching network) at the base of the mast, to match the transmission line to the mast. This may be located in a waterproof box or a small shed called an antenna tuning hut (helix house) next to the mast. The antenna tuning circuit matches the characteristic impedance of the feedline to the impedance of the antenna (given by the graph below), and includes a reactance, usually a loading coil, to tune out the reactance of the antenna, to make it resonant at the operating frequency. Without the antenna tuner the impedance mismatch between the antenna and feedline would cause a condition called standing waves (high SWR), in which some of the radio power is reflected back down the feedline toward the transmitter, resulting in inefficiency and possibly overheating the transmitter. From the antenna tuner a short feedline is bolted or brazed to the mast.

The other side of the feedline from the antenna tuner is grounded, connected to a radial ground system consisting of many bare wires buried shallowly in the ground radiating outward from a terminal near the base of the mast.

There are several ways of feeding a mast radiator:

- Series excited (base feed): the mast is supported on an insulator, and is fed at the bottom; one side of the feedline from the helix house is connected to the bottom of the mast and the other to a ground system under the mast. This is the most common feed type, used in most AM radio station masts.
- Shunt excited: the bottom of the mast is grounded, and one side of the feedline is connected to the mast part way up, and the other to the ground system under the mast. The impedance of the mast increases along its length, so by choosing the right height to connect, the antenna can be impedance matched to the feedline. This avoids the need to insulate the mast from the ground, eliminates the need for an isolator in the aircraft light power line and the electric shock hazard of high voltages on the base of the mast.
- Folded unipole: this can be considered a variation of shunt feed, above. The antenna mast is grounded and a tubular "skirt" of wires is attached to the top of the antenna and hangs down parallel to the mast, surrounding it, to ground level, where it is fed. It has a wider bandwidth than a single tower.
- Sectional: also known as an "anti-fading aerial", the mast is divided into two sections with an insulator between them to make two stacked vertical antennas, fed in phase. This collinear arrangement enhances low-angle (ground wave) radiation and reduces high-angle (sky wave) radiation. This increases the distance to the mush area where the ground wave and sky wave are at similar strength at night.

Government regulations usually require the power fed to the antenna to be monitored at the antenna base, so the antenna tuning hut also includes an antenna current sampling circuit, which sends its measurements back to the transmitter control room. The hut also usually contains the power supply for the aircraft warning lights.

=== Mast height and radiation pattern ===
Measured vertical radiation patterns of 3 different height monopole mast radiator antennas mounted on the ground. The distance of the line from the origin at a given elevation angle is proportional to the power density radiated at that angle. For a given power input, the power radiated in horizontal directions increases with height from the quarter-wave monopole (0.25λ, blue) through the half-wave monopole (0.5λ, green) to a maximum at a length of 0.625λ (red)

Measured base resistance (R) and reactance (X) of a typical base-fed mast radiator vs height

The ideal height of a mast radiator depends on transmission frequency $f$, the geographical distribution of the listening audience, and terrain. An unsectionalized mast radiator is a monopole antenna, and its vertical radiation pattern, the amount of power it radiates at different elevation angles, is determined by its height $h$ compared to the wavelength $\lambda = c/f$ of the radio waves, equal to the speed of light $c$ divided by the frequency $f$. The height of the mast is usually specified in fractions of the wavelength, or in "electrical degrees"

$$G = 360^\circ {h \over \lambda}$$

where each degree equals $\lambda/360$ meters. The current distribution on the mast determines the radiation pattern. The radio frequency current flows up the mast and reflects from the top, and the direct and reflected current interfere, creating an approximately sinusoidal standing wave on the mast with a node (point of zero current) at the top and a maxima one quarter wavelength down

$$i(y) = I_\text{max}\sin (G - y)$$

where $i(y)$ is the current at a height of $y$ electrical degrees above the ground, and $I_\text{max}$ is the maximum current. At heights of a little less than a multiple of a quarter wavelength, ${1 \over 4}\lambda, {1 \over 2}\lambda, {3 \over 4}\lambda$ ...(G = 90°, 180°, 270°...) the mast is resonant; at these heights the antenna presents a pure resistance to the feedline, simplifying impedance matching the feedline to the antenna. At other lengths the antenna has capacitive reactance or inductive reactance. However masts of these lengths can be fed efficiently by cancelling the reactance of the antenna with a conjugate reactance in the matching network in the helix house. Due to the finite thickness of the mast, resistance, and other factors the actual antenna current on the mast differs significantly from the ideal sine wave assumed above, and as shown by the graph, resonant lengths of a typical tower are closer to 80°, 140°, and 240°.

Ground waves travel horizontally away from the antenna just above the ground, therefore the goal of most mast designs is to radiate a maximum amount of power in horizontal directions. An ideal monopole antenna radiates maximum power in horizontal directions at a height of 225 electrical degrees, about 5/8 or 0.625 of a wavelength (this is an approximation valid for a typical finite thickness mast; for an infinitely thin mast the maximum occurs at $2\lambda/\pi$ = 0.637$\lambda$) As shown in the diagram, at heights below a half wavelength (180 electrical degrees) the radiation pattern of the antenna has a single lobe with a maximum in horizontal directions. At heights above a half wavelength the pattern splits and has a second lobe directed into the sky at an angle of about 60°. The reason horizontal radiation is maximum at 0.625$\lambda$ is that at slightly above a half wavelength, the opposite phase radiation from the two lobes interferes destructively and cancels at high elevation angles, causing most of the power to be emitted in horizontal directions. Heights above 0.625$\lambda$ are not generally used because above this the power radiated in horizontal directions decreases rapidly due to increasing power wasted into the sky in the second lobe.

For medium wave AM broadcast band masts 0.625$\lambda$ would be a height of 117–341 m (384–1,119 feet), and taller for longwave masts. The high construction costs of such tall masts mean frequently shorter masts are used.

The above gives the radiation pattern of a perfectly conducting mast over perfectly conducting ground. The actual strength of the received signal at any point on the ground is determined by two factors, the power radiated by the antenna in that direction and the path attenuation between the transmitting antenna and the receiver, which depends on ground conductivity. The design process of an actual radio mast usually involves doing a survey of soil conductivity, then using an antenna simulation computer program to calculate a map of signal strength produced by actual commercially available masts over the actual terrain. This is compared with the audience population distribution to find the best design.

=== Anti-fading designs ===
A second design goal that affects height is to reduce multipath fading in the reception area. Some of the radio energy radiated at an angle into the sky is reflected by layers of charged particles in the ionosphere and returns to Earth in the reception area. This is called the skywave. At certain distances from the antenna these radio waves are out of phase with the ground waves, and the two radio waves interfere destructively and partly or completely cancel each other, reducing the signal strength. This is called fading. At night when ionospheric reflection is strongest, this results in an annular region of low signal strength around the antenna in which reception may be inadequate, sometimes called a "zone of silence", fading wall or mush area. However multipath fading only becomes significant if the signal strength of the skywave is within about 50% (3 dB) of the ground wave. By reducing the height of a monopole slightly the power radiated in the second lobe can be reduced enough to eliminate multipath fading, with only a small reduction in horizontal gain. The optimum height is around 190 electrical degrees or 0.53$\lambda$, so this is another common height for masts.

==== Sectionalized masts ====
A type of mast with improved anti-fading performance is the sectionalized mast, also called an anti-fading mast. In a sectionalized mast, insulators in the vertical support members divide the mast into two vertically stacked conductive sections, which are fed in phase by separate feedlines. This increases the proportion of power radiated in horizontal directions and allows the mast to be taller than 0.625$\lambda$ without excessive high angle radiation. Practical sectionals with heights of 120 over 120 degrees, 180 over 120 degrees and 180 over 180 degrees are presently in operation with good results.

=== Electrically short masts ===
The lower limit to the frequency at which mast radiators can be used is in the low frequency band, due to the increasing inefficiency of masts shorter than a quarter wavelength.

As frequency decreases the wavelength increases, requiring a taller antenna to make a given fraction of a wavelength. Construction costs and land area required increase with height, putting a practical limit on mast height. Masts over 300 m (980 feet) are prohibitively expensive and very few have been built; the tallest masts in the world are around 600 m (2,000 feet). Another constraint in some areas is height restrictions on structures; near airports aviation authorities may limit the maximum height of masts. These constraints often require a mast be used that is shorter than the ideal height.

Antennas significantly shorter than the fundamental resonant length of one-quarter of the wavelength (0.25$\lambda$, 90 electrical degrees) are called electrically short antennas. Electrically short antennas are efficient radiators; the gain of even a short antenna is very close to that of a quarter-wave antenna. However they cannot be driven efficiently due to their low radiation resistance. The radiation resistance of the antenna, the electrical resistance which represents power radiated as radio waves, which is around 25–37 ohms at one-quarter wavelength, decreases below one-quarter wavelength with the square of the ratio of mast height to wavelength. Other electrical resistances in the antenna system, the ohmic resistance of the mast and the buried ground system, are in series with the radiation resistance, and the transmitter power divides proportionally between them. As the radiation resistance decreases more of the transmitter power is dissipated as heat in these resistances, reducing the efficiency of the antenna. Masts shorter than 0.17$\lambda$ (60 electrical degrees) are seldom used. At this height, the radiation resistance is about 10 ohms, so the typical resistance of a buried ground system, 2 ohms, is about 20% of the radiation resistance, so below this height over 20% of the transmitter power is wasted in the ground system.

A second problem with electrically short masts is that the capacitive reactance of the mast is high, requiring a large loading coil in the antenna tuner to tune it out and make the mast resonant. The high reactance vs the low resistance give the antenna a high Q factor; the antenna and coil act as a high Q tuned circuit, reducing the usable bandwidth of the antenna.

At lower frequencies mast radiators are replaced by more elaborate capacitively toploaded antennas such as the T antenna or umbrella antenna which can have higher efficiency.

=== Capacitive toploads ===
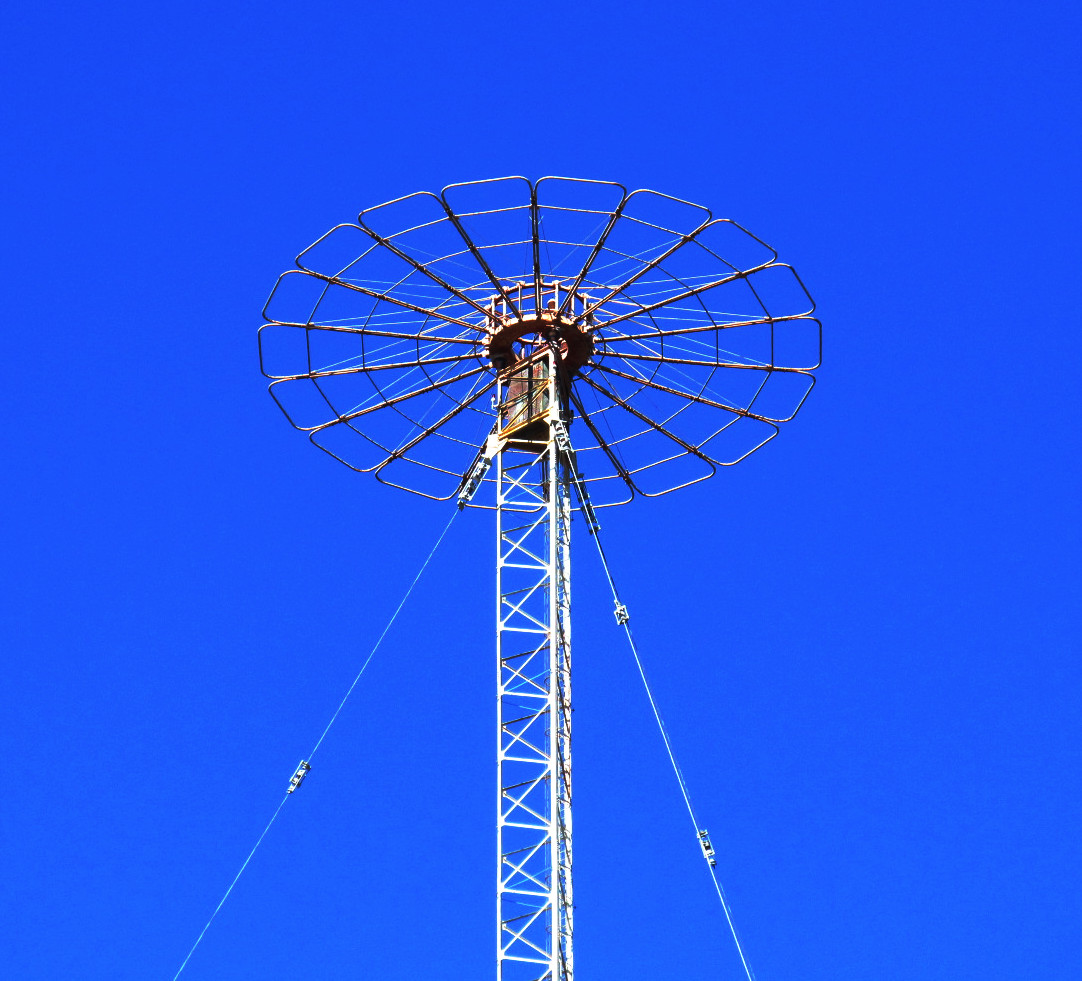
Capacitive "top hat" on mast of AM radio tower in Hamersley, Australia

In circumstances in which short masts must be used, a capacitive topload (also known as top hat or capacitance hat) is sometimes added at the top of the mast to increase the radiated power. This is a round screen or radiate crown of horizontal wires extending horizontally from the top of the antenna. It functions as a capacitor plate, with the ground below being the complementary plate; the increased current in the mast required to charge and discharge the top load capacitance each RF cycle increases the radiated power in the vertical section of the antenna. Since the top load acts electrically like an additional length of mast, this is called "electrically lengthening" the antenna. Another way to construct a capacity hat is to use sections of the top guy wire set, by inserting the strain insulators in the guy line a short distance from the mast. For simple masts, capacity hats are structurally limited to the equivalent of about 15-30 degrees of added electrical height; umbrella antennas exceed this limit by having added structural support for the "hat".

=== Grounding system ===
For mast radiators the earth under the mast is part of the antenna; the current fed to the mast passes through the air into the ground under the antenna as displacement current (oscillating electric field). The ground also serves as a ground plane to reflect the radio waves. The antenna is fed power between the bottom of the mast and ground so it requires a grounding (Earthing) system under the antenna to make contact with the soil to collect the return current. One side of the feedline from the helix house is attached to the mast, and the other side to the ground system. The ground system is in series with the antenna and carries the full antenna current, so for efficiency its resistance must be kept low, under two ohms, so it consists of a network of cables buried in the earth. Since for an omnidirectional antenna the Earth currents travel radially toward the ground point from all directions, the grounding system usually consists of a radial pattern of buried cables extending outward from the base of the mast in all directions, connected together to the ground lead at a terminal next to the base.

The transmitter power lost in the ground resistance, and so the efficiency of the antenna, depends on the soil conductivity. This varies widely; marshy ground or ponds, particularly salt water, provide the lowest resistance ground. The RF current density in the earth, and thus the power loss per square meter, increases the closer one gets to the ground terminal at the base of the mast, so the radial ground system can be thought of as replacing the soil with a higher conductivity medium, copper, in the parts of the ground carrying high current density, to reduce power losses.

A standard widely used ground system acceptable to the US Federal Communications Commission (FCC) is 120 equally-spaced radial ground wires extending out one quarter of a wavelength (.25$\lambda$, 90 electrical degrees) from the mast. No. 10 gauge soft-drawn copper wire is typically used, buried 10 to 25 cm (4 to 10 inches) deep. For AM broadcast band masts this requires a circular land area extending from the mast 47–136 m (154–446 feet). This is usually planted with grass, which is kept mowed short as tall grass can increase power loss in certain circumstances. If the land area around the mast is too limited for such long radials, they can in many cases be replaced by a greater number of shorter radials. The metal support under the mast insulator is bonded to the ground system with conductive metal straps so no voltage appears across the concrete pad supporting the mast, as concrete has poor dielectric qualities.

For masts near a half-wavelength high (180 electrical degrees) the mast has a voltage maximum (antinode) near its base, which results in strong electric fields in the earth above the ground wires near the mast where the displacement current enters the ground. This can cause significant dielectric power losses in the earth. To reduce this loss these antennas often use a conductive copper ground screen around the mast connected to the buried ground wires, either lying on the ground or elevated a few feet, to shield the ground from the electric field. Another solution is to increase the number of ground wires near the mast and bury them very shallowly in a surface layer of asphalt pavement, which has low dielectric losses.

== Ancillary equipment ==
=== Fencing ===
Base-fed mast radiators have a high voltage on the base of the mast, which can deliver a dangerous electric shock to a grounded person touching it. The potential on the mast is typically several thousand volts with respect to the ground. Electrical codes require such exposed high voltage equipment to be fenced off from the public, so the mast and antenna tuning hut are surrounded by a locked fence. Usually a chain-link fence is used, but sometimes wooden fences are used to prevent currents induced in a metallic fence from distorting the radiation pattern of the antenna. An alternate design is to mount the mast on top of the antenna tuning hut, out of the reach of the public, eliminating the need for a fence.

=== Aircraft warning lights ===
Antenna masts are tall enough that they can be a hazard to aircraft. Aviation regulations require masts to be painted in alternating strips of international orange and white paint, and have aircraft warning lights along their length, to make them more visible to aircraft. Regulations require flashing lights at the top, and (depending on height) at several points along the length of the tower. The high radio frequency voltage on the mast poses a problem for powering the warning lights: the power cable which runs down the mast from the lights to connect to the mains power line is at the high RF potential of the mast. Without protective equipment it would conduct radio frequency (RF) current to the AC power wiring ground, short-circuiting the mast. To prevent this a protective isolator is installed in the lighting power cable at the base of the mast which blocks the RF current while letting the low frequency 50 or 60 Hz AC power pass through up the mast. Several types of isolator devices have been used:

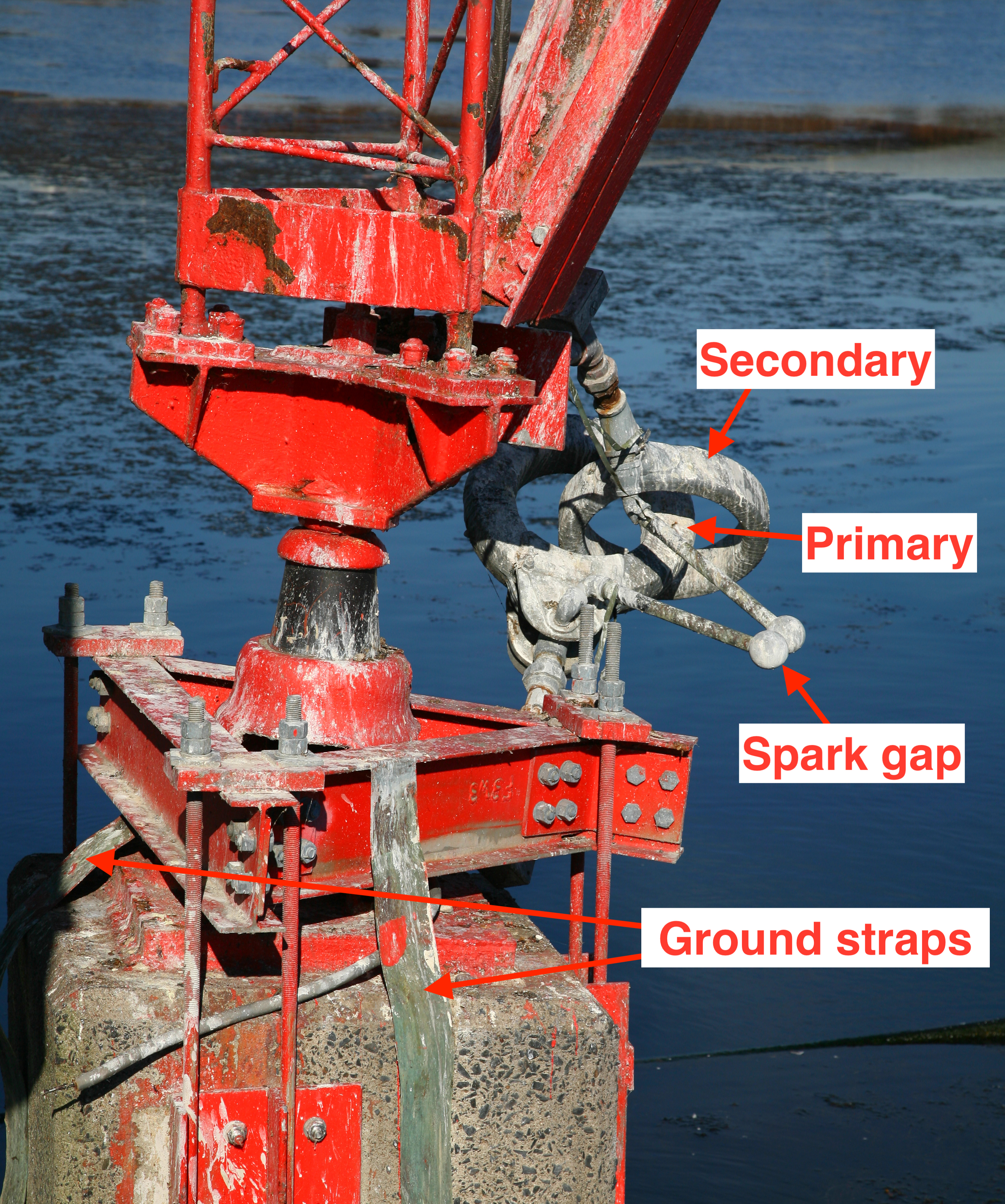
Austin transformer at the base of the WMCA and WNYC transmitter tower in Kearny, New Jersey

- Austin transformer – this is a specialized type of isolation transformer made specifically for this use, in which the primary and secondary windings of the transformer are separated by an air gap, wide enough so the high voltage on the antenna cannot jump across. It consists of a ring-shaped toroidal iron core with the primary winding wrapped around it, mounted on a bracket extending from the concrete base below the antenna insulator, connected to the lighting power source. The secondary winding which provides power to the mast lights is a ring-shaped coil that threads through the toroidal core like two links in a chain, with an air gap between the two. The magnetic field created by the primary winding induces current in the secondary winding without the necessity of a direct connection between them.
- Choke – this consists of an inductor, a coil of fine wire wound around a cylindrical form. The impedance (resistance to AC current) of an inductor increases with the frequency of the current. The isolation choke is a low-pass filter, it is constructed to have a high impedance at radio frequencies which prevents the RF current from passing through, but negligible impedance at the lower 50/60 Hz mains frequency, so the AC power can pass through to the lights. A choke is inserted in each of the 3 lines (hot, neutral, safety ground) that make up the power cable. The low voltage end of each choke is bypassed through a capacitor to ground, so high voltage induced in the low voltage end by capacitive coupling through the interwinding capacitance of the choke is conducted to ground.
- Parallel resonant circuit (trap) – this consists of an inductor and capacitor connected in parallel in the power line. The values of the inductance and capacitance are chosen so the circuit's resonant frequency is the operating frequency of the antenna. A parallel resonant circuit has a very high impedance (thousands of ohms) at its resonant frequency, so it blocks the RF current, but low impedance at all other frequencies, allowing the AC lighting power through. This circuit only blocks the specific frequency it is tuned to, so if the frequency of the radio transmitter is changed, the trap must be adjusted.

=== Lightning protection and grounding switch ===
At its base, the mast should have a lightning arrester consisting of a ball or horn spark gap between the mast and the ground terminal, so that current from a lightning strike to the mast will be conducted to ground. The conductor from the lightning arrester should go directly to a metal ground stake by the shortest path. The top of the mast should have a lightning rod to protect the top aircraft warning light. The mast should also have a DC path to ground, so that static electric charges on the mast can drain off. Also at the base is a grounding switch, which is used to connect the mast to the ground system during maintenance operations to ensure that there is no chance that high voltage will be present on the mast when personnel are working on it.

=== Colocated antennas ===
A tall radio mast is a convenient structure to mount other wireless antennas on, so many radio stations lease space on their towers to other radio services for their antennas. These are called colocated antennas. Types of antenna often mounted on mast radiators are: fiberglass whip antennas for land mobile radio systems for taxi and delivery services, dish antennas for microwave relay links carrying commercial telecommunications and internet data, FM radio broadcasting antennas consisting of collinear bays of twisted dipole elements, and cellular base station antennas.

As long as the colocated antennas do not operate at frequencies anywhere near the transmitting frequency of the mast, it is usually possible to isolate them electrically from the voltage on the mast. The transmission lines feeding RF power to the colocated antennas pose much the same problem as the aircraft lighting power lines: they have to pass down the tower and across the base insulator and connect to low voltage equipment, so without isolation devices, they will carry the high mast voltage and can short circuit the mast to ground. The transmission lines are isolated by low-pass filter inductors consisting of helixes of coaxial cable wound on a nonconductive form.

== History ==
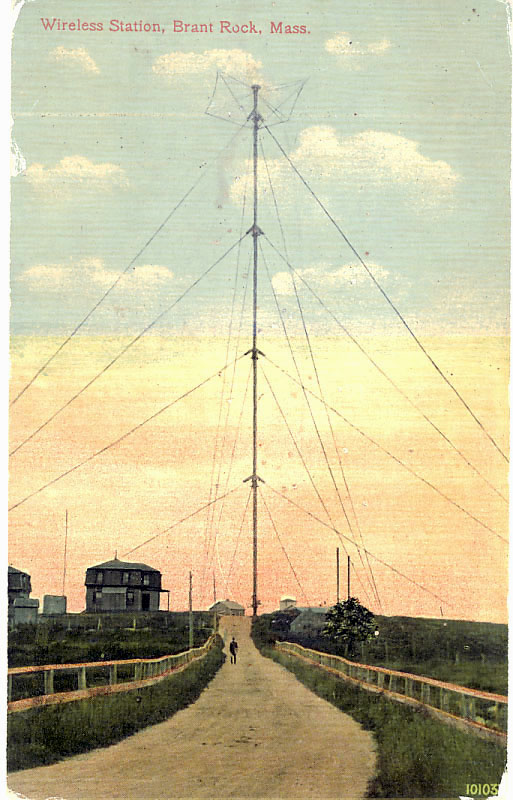
Fessenden's 130-meter (420 ft) tubular mast radiator from 1906

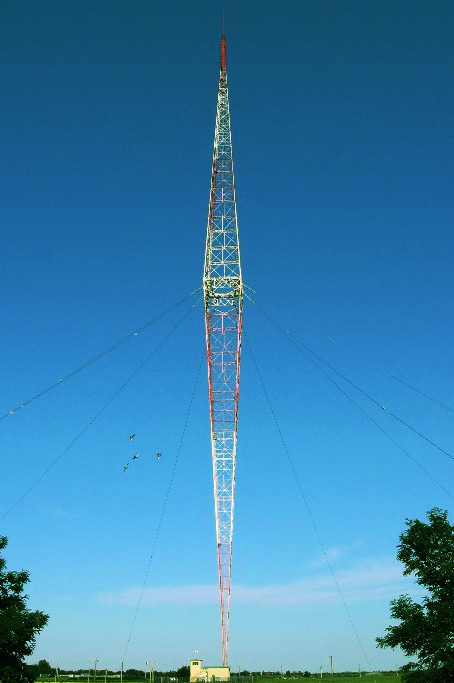
An example of a Blaw-Knox mast, Lakihegy Tower, a 314-meter (1,030 ft) mast in Hungary built in 1933

The vertical or monopole antenna was invented and patented by radio entrepreneur Guglielmo Marconi in 1896 during his development of the first practical radio transmitters and receivers. He initially used horizontal dipole antennas invented by Heinrich Hertz, but was not able to communicate further than a few miles. He discovered by experiment that if he connected one terminal of his transmitter and receiver to a vertical wire suspended overhead, and the other terminal to a metal plate buried in the Earth, he could transmit for longer distances. Marconi's antennas, as well as most other vertical antennas through the 1920s, were constructed of wires suspended by wooden masts.

One of the first large mast radiators was the experimental tubular 130-meter (420 ft) mast erected in 1906 by Reginald Fessenden for his spark gap transmitter at Brant Rock, Massachusetts with which he made the first two-way transatlantic transmission, communicating with an identical antenna in Machrihanish, Scotland. However, during the radiotelegraphy era before 1920 most long-distance radio stations transmitted in the longwave band, which limited the vertical height of the radiator to much less than a quarter wavelength, so the antenna was electrically short and had low radiation resistance from 5 to 30 ohms. Therefore, most transmitters used capacitively toploaded antennas like the umbrella antenna or inverted L and T antenna to increase the power radiated. During this era, the operation of antennas was little understood, and designs were based on trial and error and half-understood rules of thumb.

The beginning of AM radio broadcasting in 1920 and the allocation of medium wave frequencies to broadcasting stations sparked an increase in interest in medium wave antennas. The flattop or T-antenna was used as the main broadcasting antenna through the 1920s. It had the disadvantage that it required two masts, twice the construction cost of a single mast antenna, far more land area, and parasitic currents in the masts distorted the radiation pattern. Two historic papers published in 1924 by Stuart Ballantine led to the development of the mast radiator. One derived the radiation resistance of a vertical monopole antenna over a ground plane. He found that the radiation resistance increased to a maximum at a length of a half wavelength, so a mast around that length had an input resistance that was much higher than the ground resistance, reducing the fraction of transmitter power that was lost in the ground system, eliminating the need for a capacitive topload. In a second paper the same year he showed that the amount of power radiated horizontally in ground waves reached a maximum at a mast height of 0.625$\lambda$ (225 electrical degrees).

By 1930 the disadvantages of the T antenna led broadcasters to adopt the mast radiator antenna. One of the first types used was the diamond cantilever or Blaw-Knox tower. This had a diamond (rhombohedral) shape which made it rigid, so only one set of guy lines was needed, at its wide waist. The pointed lower end of the antenna ended in a large ceramic insulator in the form of a ball-and-socket joint on a concrete base, relieving bending moments on the structure. The first, a 200-meter (665 ft) half-wave mast was installed at radio station WABC's 50 kW Wayne, New Jersey transmitter in 1931. Radial wire ground systems were also introduced during this era.

During the 1930s the broadcast industry recognized the problem of multipath fading, that at night high angle waves reflected from the ionosphere interfered with the ground waves, causing an annular region of poor reception at a certain distance from the antenna. It was found that the diamond shape of the Blaw-Knox tower had an unfavorable current distribution which increased the power emitted at high angles. By the 1940s the AM broadcast industry had abandoned the Blaw-Knox design for the narrow, uniform cross section lattice mast used today, which had a better radiation pattern. It was found that reducing the height of the monopole mast from 225 electrical degrees to 190 degrees could eliminate the high angle radio waves that caused fading. Sectional masts were also developed in this era.

== See also ==
- Radio masts and towers
- Guyed mast
