= Mush area =

Mediumwave broadcasting region

In mediumwave broadcasting, a mush area is a region where the ground wave and sky wave from a transmitter are received at approximately equal signal strength, resulting in interference between the two, which will typically cause serious fading.

The effect can reduce the coverage area of a transmission at night, even in the absence of interfering signals from any other source.

It can be mitigated to some extent by the use of a tall mast radiator of up to about 0.6 wavelengths height, which increases the ground wave field strength while reducing high-angle sky wave radiation.
