= Common mode current =

Common mode current is the portion of conductor currents that are unmatched with the exactly opposite and equal magnitude currents. Common mode current cause multiconductors to act or behave like a single conductor. In electromagnetic compatibility (EMC), there are two common terms that will be found in many electromagnetic interference discussions or considered as fundamental concepts, those are Differential Mode and Common Mode. Those terms are related to coupling mechanisms. Many electrical systems contain elements that are capable of acting like an antenna. Each element is capable of unintentionally emitting Radio Frequency energy through electric, magnetic, and electromagnetic means. Common Mode coupling as well as Differential Mode coupling can occur in both a conducted and radiated way.

== Definitions ==
Differential mode (DM) is where the signal or power propagation through a conductor and return using the intended path by the designer or flowing differently in opposition to each other. Meanwhile common mode (CM) is where the parasitic circuit (unwanted) is formed between the desired circuit (main and return path) and the structure of the circuit within which it is located. The signal or power propagates in the same direction in the same circuit.

Henry Ott remarked something similar in his book. Differential mode is the result of the normal operation of the circuit and results from electric current flowing around loops formed by the electrical conductors of the circuit. Common mode is the result of parasitics in the circuit and results from undesired voltage drops in the conductors.

Clayton R. Paul provide a simple illustration that explains CM and DM terms on his book. A pair of parallel conductors with current Î_{1} and Î_{2} flowing on each conductor, which can be decomposed into CM and DM current respectively.

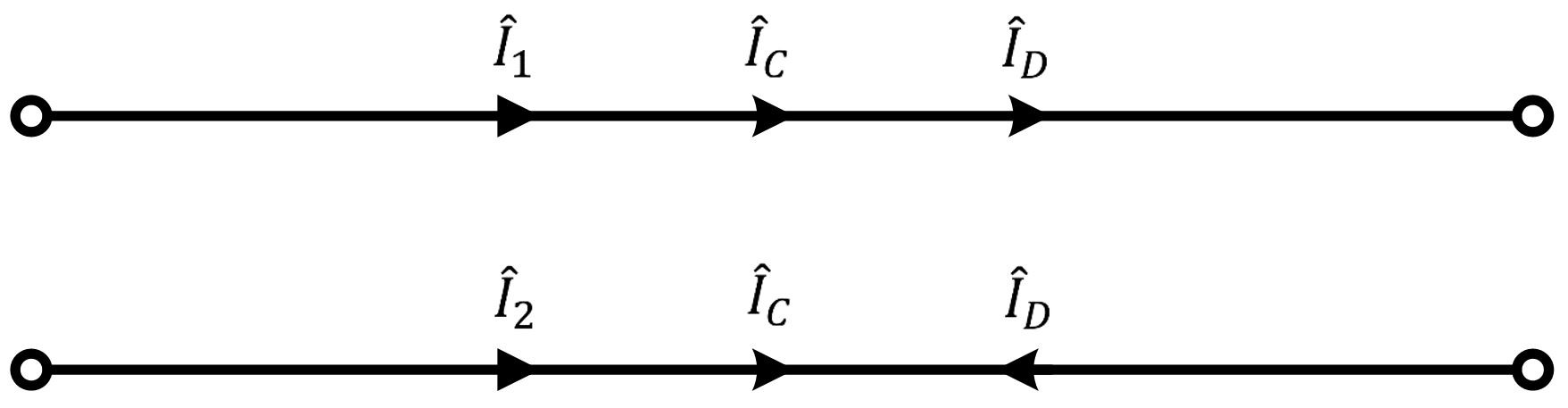
Fig. 1. CM and DM Current Illustration on Pair Conductors.

As shown in the figure above, the relations between Î_{1} , Î_{2} and modal current are given:

Î_{1}= Î_{C} + Î_{D}
Î_{2}= Î_{C} - Î_{D}

From those two equations, the modal current were obtained as follows:

Î_{D}= 1/2(Î_{1} - Î_{2})
Î_{C}= 1/2(Î_{1} + Î_{2})

The CM current flowing in each conductor is equal in magnitude and directed in the same direction, while DM current has equal magnitude but is directed in different direction.

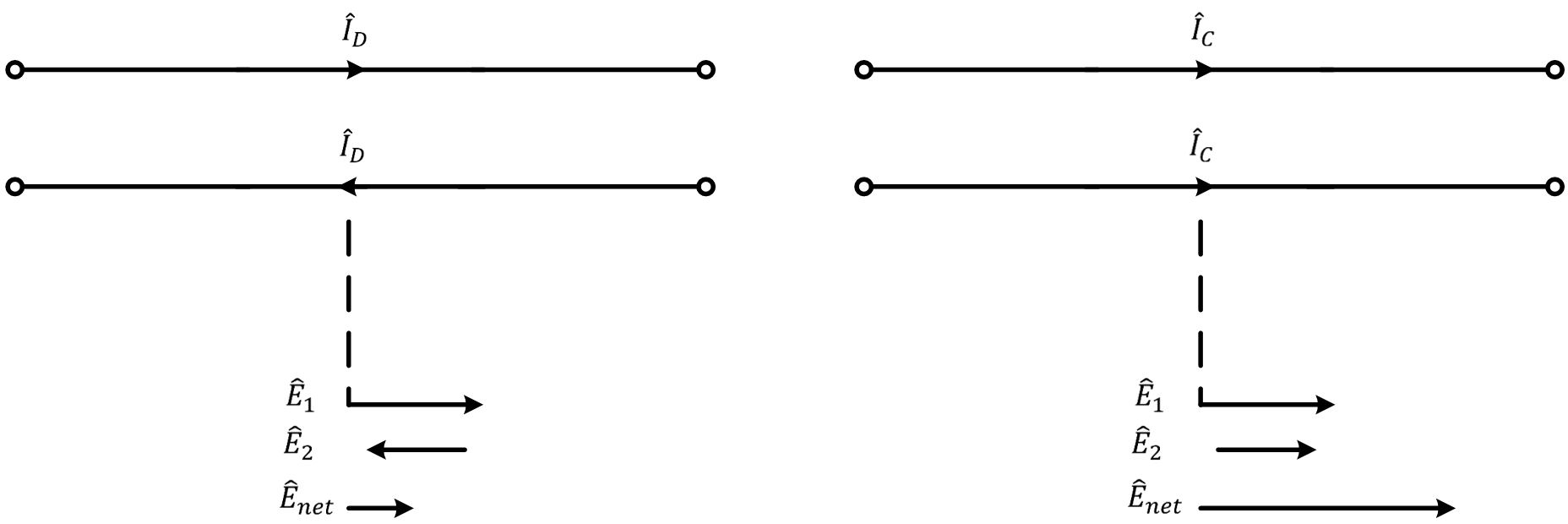
Fig. 2. Illustration for Relative Radiated Electric Field from DM and CM Current.

The radiated electric field from both conductors can be superimposed to obtain the total radiated electric field. For Differential Mode Current, since the conductors are not located in close vicinity, the fields do not exactly cancel each other, but the resultant is a small net radiated electric field. Different from DM current, CM current is directed in the same direction and results in a much higher electric field because fields from both conductors will be added. So a small CM current has a much higher potential towards producing radiated emissions compared to DM current. For conducted interference, if the interference doesn't appear between conductors, it will appear between each conductor to a third reference point, for example a structure near the conductor.

Conducted CM interference causes more problems compared to DM interference because of the possible third reference point that could include any structure that is normally not designed for the purpose. Therefore:

- CM current is difficult to be predicted and controlled;
- The interference varies with time because of the uncontrolled structural changes;
- Can pollute variety of unrelated equipment;
- The CM current can flow within a large and uncontrolled loop, increasing their potential for radiated coupling.

== Measurement ==
Common Mode current measurement is carried out to determine the conducted interference or radiated interference that happened in an electrical system due to the high probability of unwanted field emission to the environment. It is also said that most failures are due to common mode currents on cable and the wire assemblies. Note that some common mode current returns through a third point path that could be an adjacent cable, a ground plane or another unexpected return path. Common mode currents in a circuit don't necessarily follow the designed schematics.

Henry Ott consultants explained a simple setup on measuring common mode current by putting a high frequency current clamp from Fischer Custom Communications on multi-conductors and connect it to a spectrum analyzer. It is assumed that all of the common mode current flowing on those multiconductors will travel using another return path that is unknown.
With a known transfer impedance, the common mode current measured from the multi-conductors can be determined by looking at the voltage shown at the spectrum analyzer. That measurement technique can work on both shielded and unshielded cables.

There are many improvisation on common mode measurement method nowadays. Here are some examples: Measurement of common mode current and Voltage can be done simultaneously without needing to do it in separate measurements. Measurement for both common mode and differential mode current can be done using two single path Line Impedance Stabilization Networks. Radiated emission from a power cable prediction using a common mode current measurement also done in United Kingdom. Electromagnetic radiation emission from a wind turbine also performed by measuring common mode current from all of the power cables and neutral cable.
