= Antenna tuning hut =

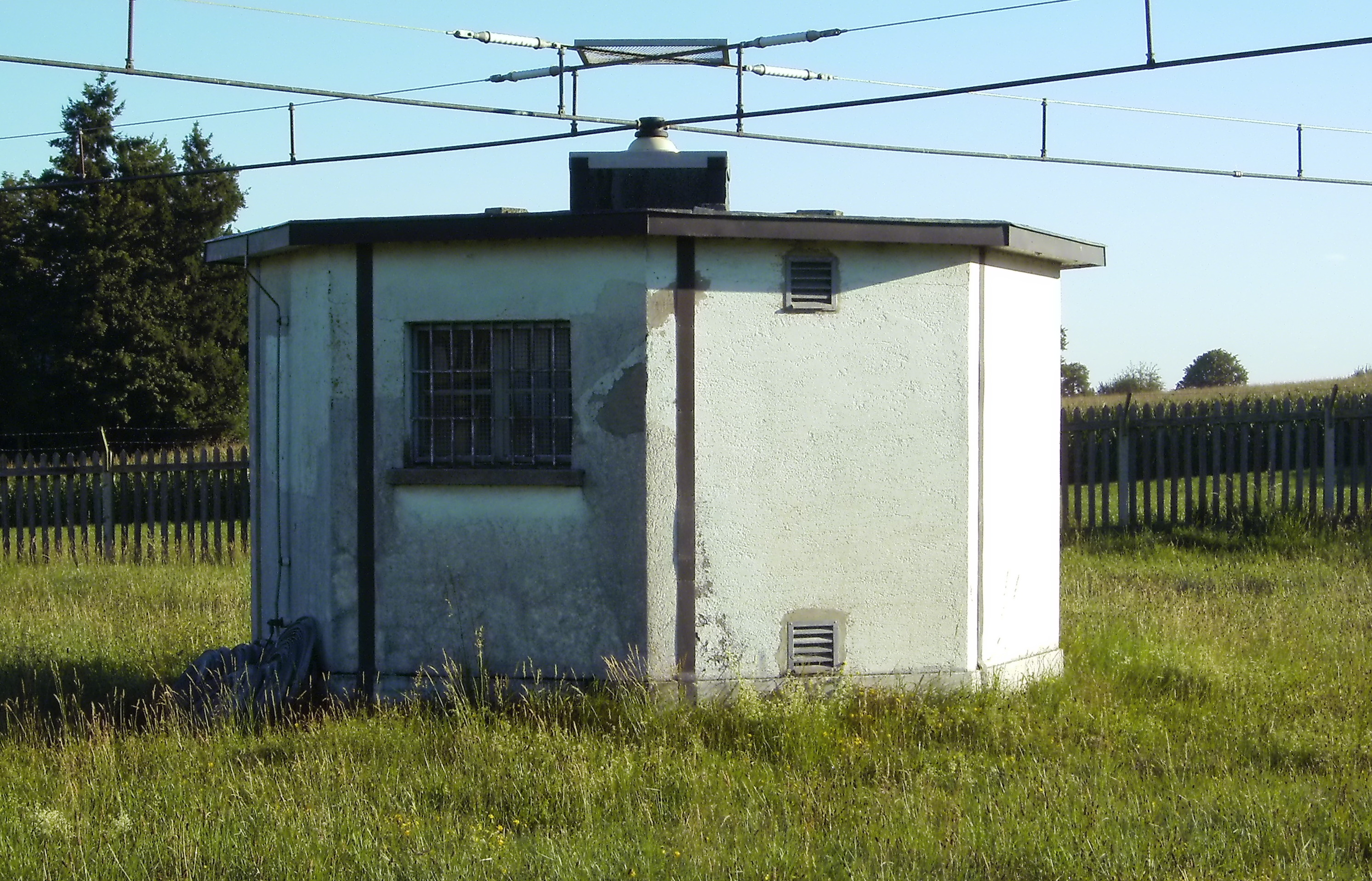
Antenna tuning hut of the backup tower for Blosenbergturm in Beromünster.

An antenna tuning hut or helix house is a small shed at the base of a longwave or mediumwave radio transmitting antenna. It contains an antenna tuner — the radio equipment used to control the connection between the feedline and the antenna. Alternative names include antenna tuning house, coupling hut, and dog house.

== Equipment ==
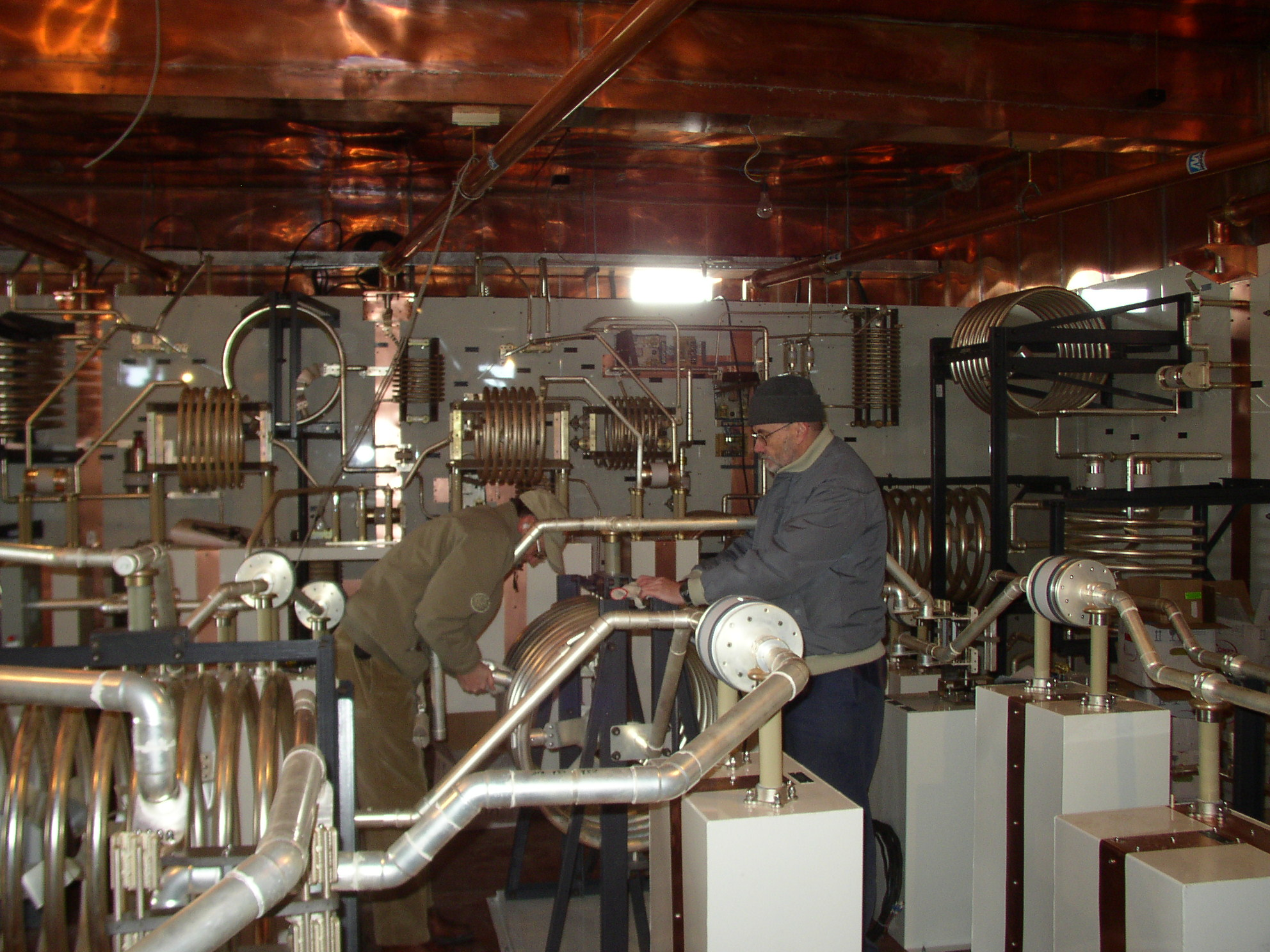
Inside the coupling hut of a 250 kW AM station with 6 antenna towers.

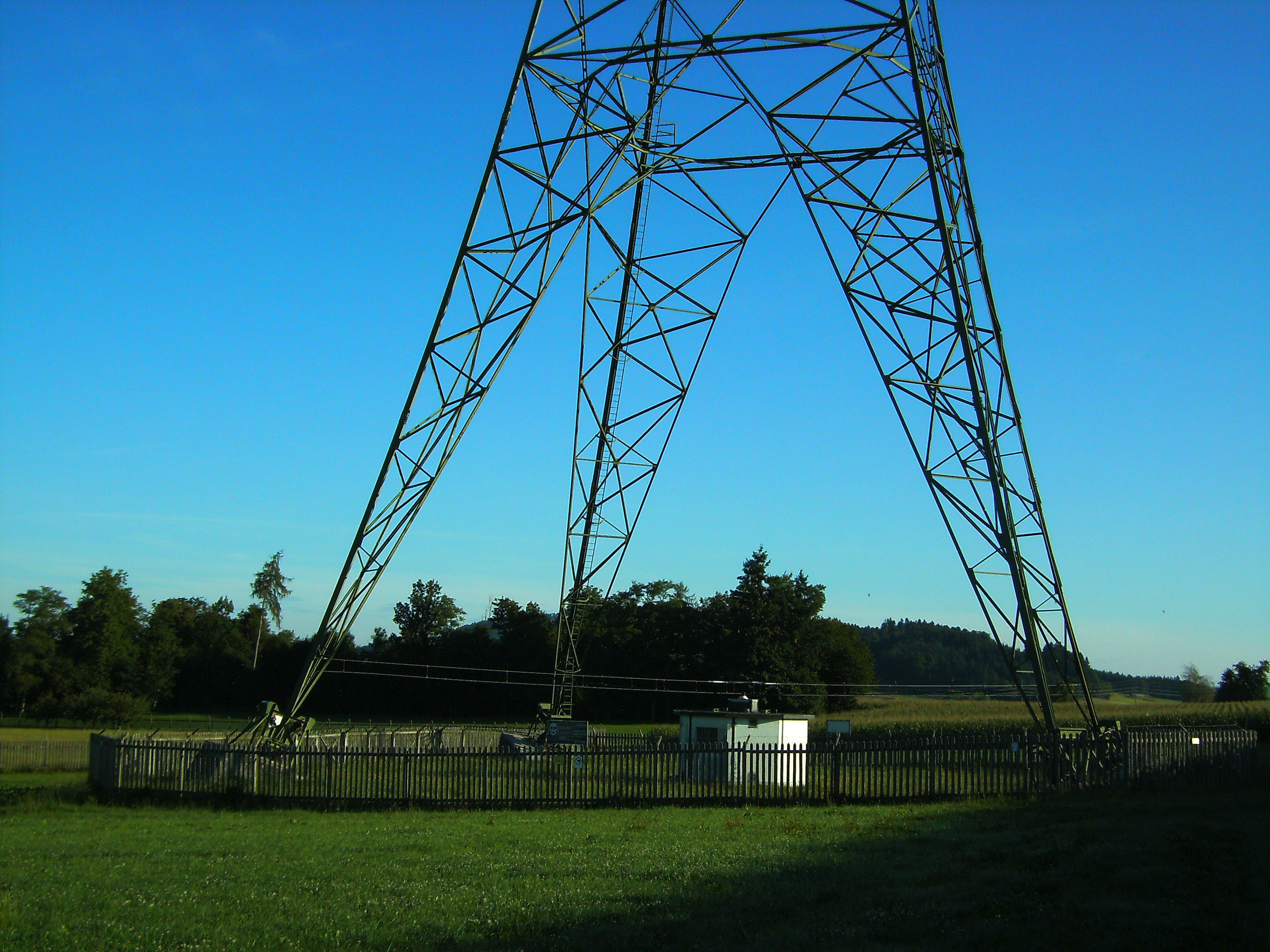
Antenna tuning hut in Beromünster shown in its location directly under the backup tower.

The radio frequency current from the transmitter is supplied to the antenna through a cable called the feedline. The antenna tuning hut contains a matching network made of high wattage capacitors and inductors (coils) that in combination match the antenna's impedance to the feedline, to efficiently transfer power into the antenna. The inductors, made of large helixes of wire, are the origin of the name helix house.

The powerful radio waves near the antenna can be a hazard for workers, so the interior of the antenna tuning hut is typically shielded with copper or aluminum sheeting or wire mesh to reduce the amount of radiation entering the hut. Antenna components may operate at several hundred thousand volts.

The building may also contain lightning protection devices and power transformers for aircraft warning lights on the tower.

The radio transmitter, which generates the radio frequency current to power the antenna, is generally located in a different building away from the antenna, so that the powerful radio waves produced by the antenna will not interfere with the sensitive circuits inside the transmitter.

== See also ==
- Antenna tuning unit
- Radio frequency power transmission
