= Austin transformer =

Type of isolating electrical transformer

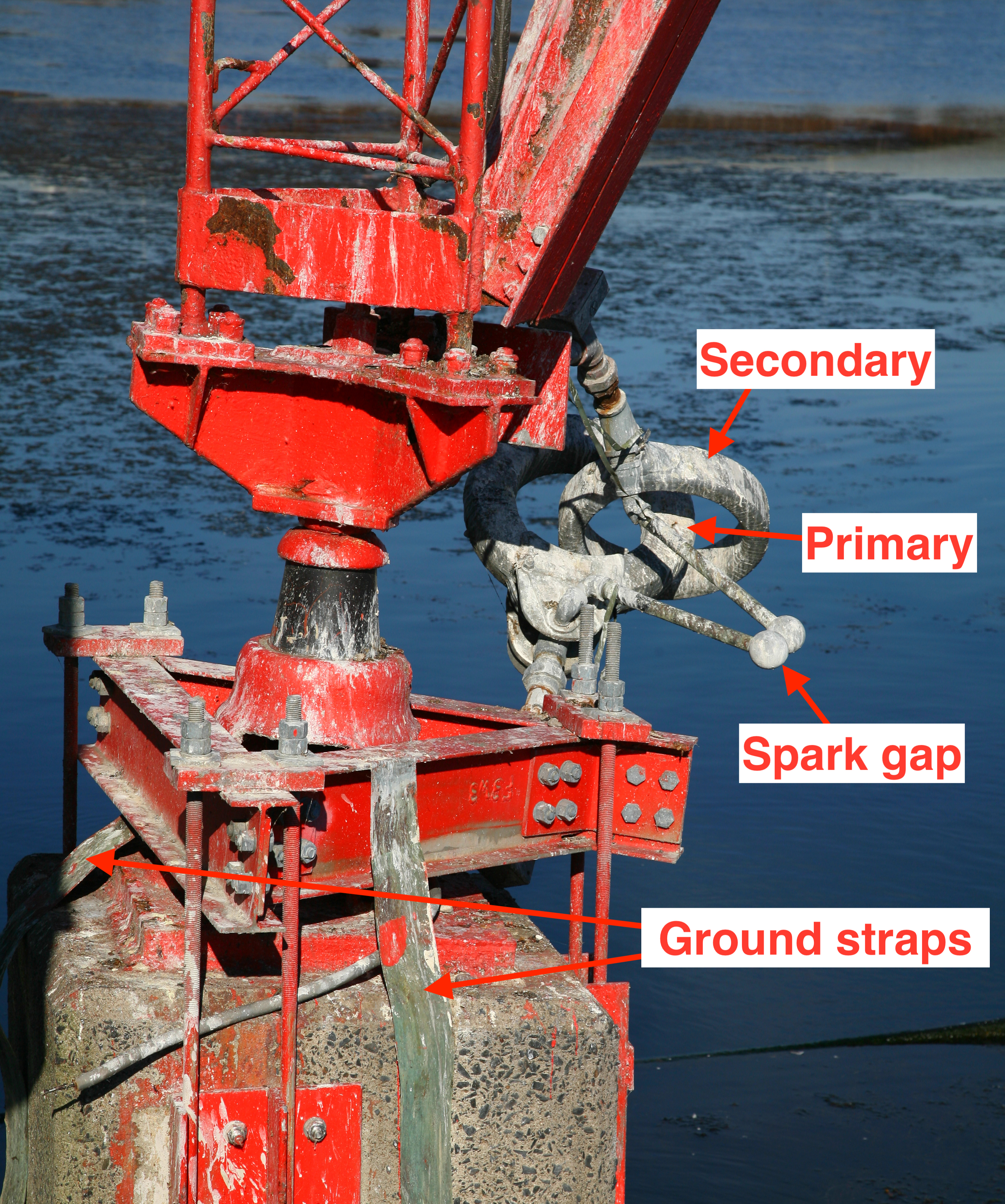
Austin ring transformer at the base of a WMCA and WNYC transmitting tower in Kearny, New Jersey. The two interlocking rings are the primary and secondary transformer windings. The spherical objects directly below and to the right of the windings are a spark ball gap, for lightning protection.

An Austin ring transformer is a special type of isolation transformer with low capacitance between the primary and secondary windings and high isolation.

== Etymology ==
It is named after its inventor, Arthur O. Austin.

== Background ==
AM radio stations that broadcast in the medium frequency (MF) and low frequency (LF) bands typically use a type of antenna called a base-fed mast radiator. This is a tall radio mast in which the steel mast structure itself is energized and serves as the antenna. The mast is mounted on a ceramic insulator to isolate it from the ground and the feedline from the transmitter is bolted to it. Typically the mast will have a radio frequency AC potential of several thousand volts on it with respect to ground during operation.

Aviation regulations require that radio towers have aircraft warning lights along their length, so the tower will be visible to aircraft at night. The high voltage on the tower poses a problem with powering the lights. The power cable that runs down the tower and connects to the utility line is at the high voltage of the mast. Without protective equipment the RF current from the mast would flow down the cable to the power line ground, short-circuiting the mast. To prevent this, a protective isolator device is installed in the lighting power cable at the base of the mast which blocks the radio frequency power while allowing the 50/60 hertz AC mains power for the lights through.

== Use and mechanism ==
The Austin transformer is a specialized type of isolation transformer made specifically for this use, in which the primary and secondary windings of the transformer are separated by an air gap, wide enough so the high voltage on the antenna cannot jump across. It consists of a ring-shaped toroidal iron core with the primary winding wrapped around it, mounted on a bracket from the mast's concrete base, connected to the lighting power source. The secondary winding which provides power to the mast lights is a ring-shaped coil which circles the toroidal core through the center, like two links in a chain, with an air gap between the two. The magnetic field created by the primary winding induces current in the secondary winding without the necessity of a direct connection between them. The wide gap of several centimeters between the coils also ensures that there is minimal interwinding capacitance, to prevent RF voltage being induced in the supply wiring by capacitive coupling. A spark gap is often located nearby with a gap smaller than the gap between the rings, to prevent damage to the transformer and transmitting equipment in the case of a lightning strike.
