= Gimmick (disambiguation) =

Gimmick is a novelty feature in marketing, magic/illusion, and psychology.

Gimmick may also refer to:

- Gimmick (professional wrestling), a professional wrestling term
- Gimmick!, a 1992 video game developed by Sunsoft
- Gimmick! (manga), a 2005–2007 manga series
- Gimmicks, toy-like weapons in the 2002 video game, Tomato Adventure
- Gimmick capacitor, a capacitor made by twisting two insulated wires together
- Gimmick (album), a 1993 album by Barkmarket
- "Gimmick", a song by Gunna from the album Wunna
- Gimmick (film), a 2019 Kannada film

== See also ==
- Gimik, 1995-6 Filipino television show
