= Isolation transformer =

Electrical component

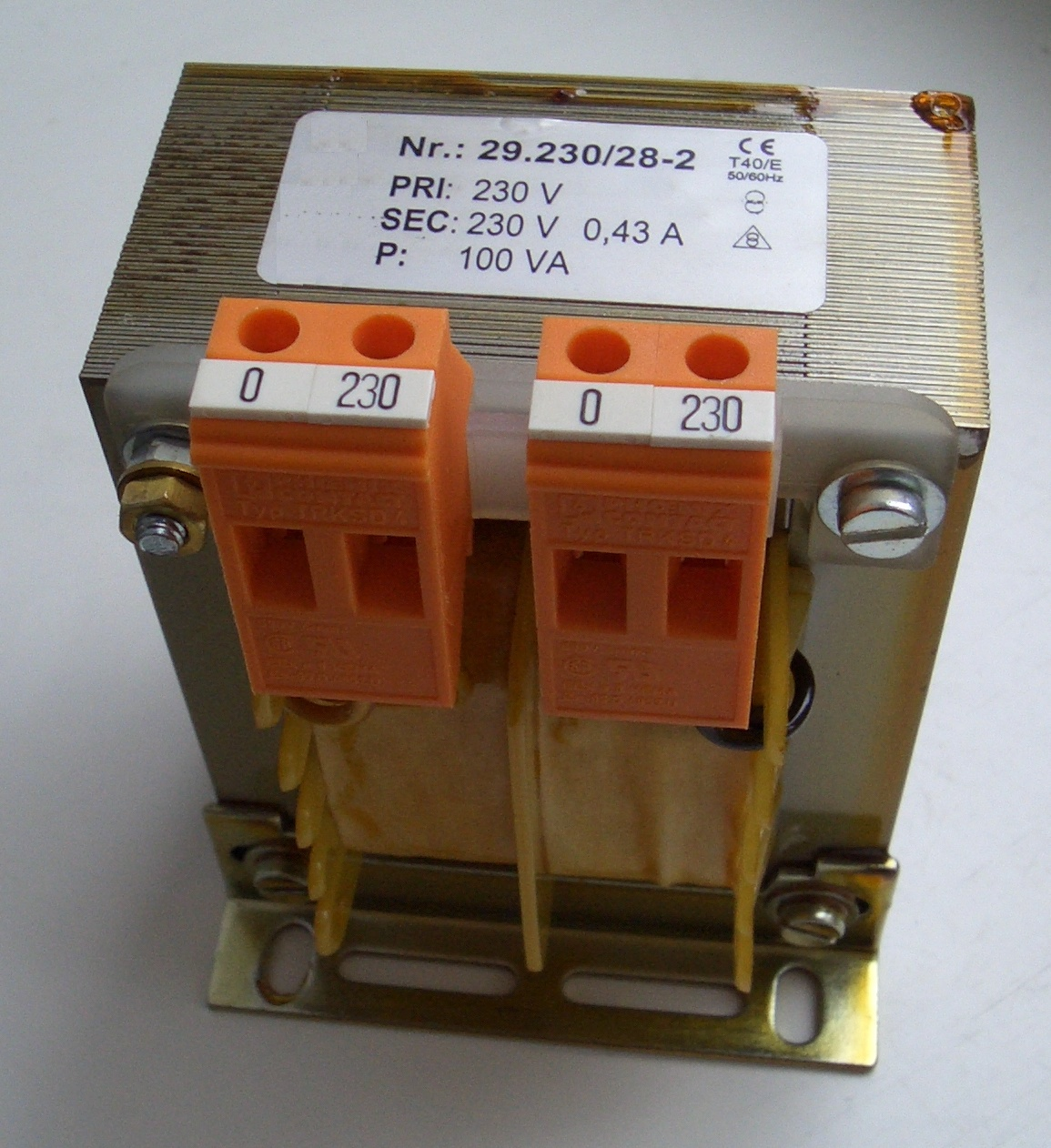
A 230 V isolation transformer

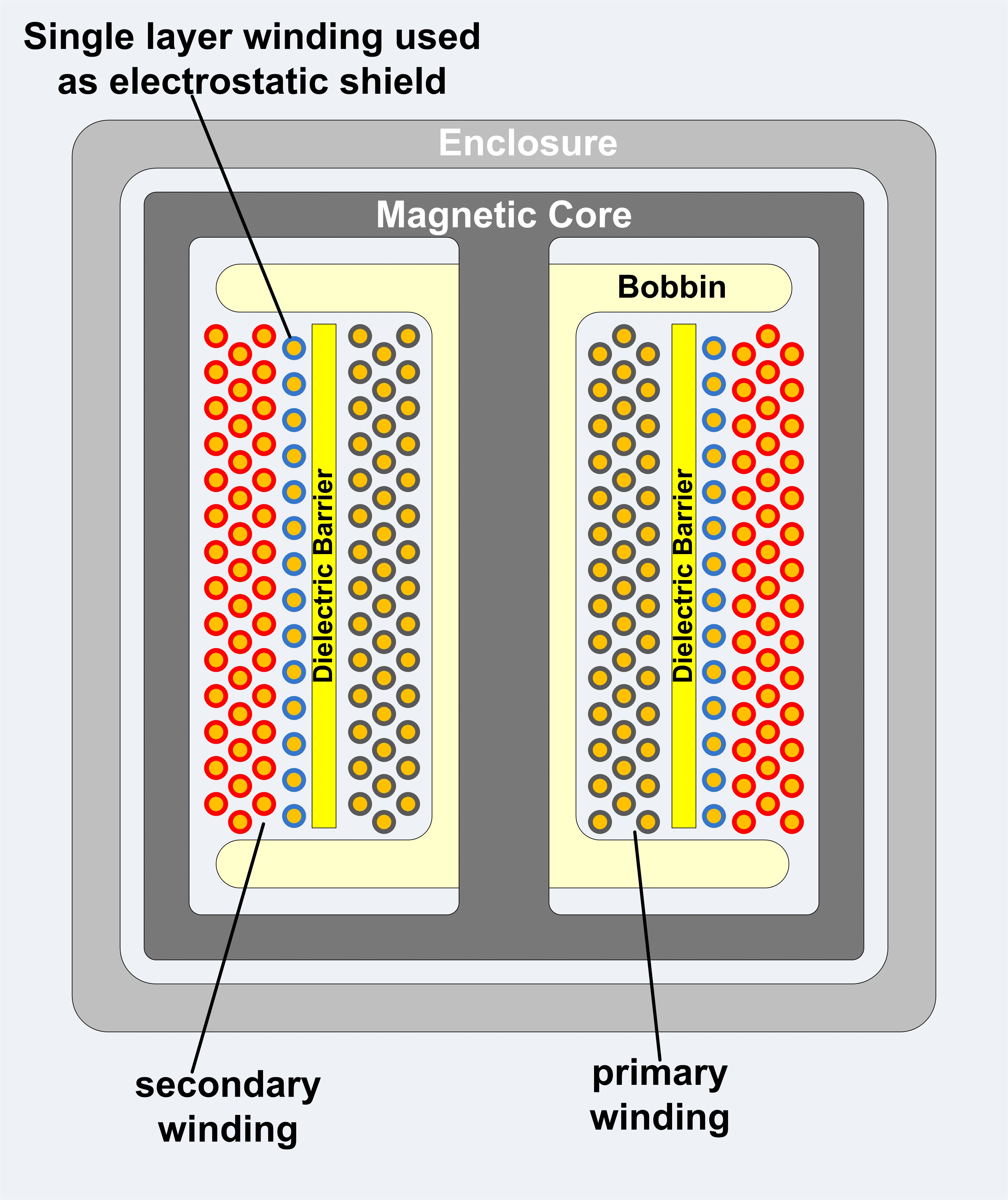
A simple 1:1 isolation transformer with an extra dielectric barrier and an electrostatic shield between primary and secondary. The grounded shield prevents capacitive coupling between primary and secondary windings.

An isolation transformer is a transformer used to transfer electrical power from a source of alternating current (AC) to some equipment or device while isolating the powered device from the power source, usually for safety reasons or to reduce transients and harmonics. Isolation transformers provide galvanic isolation; no conductive path is present between source and load. This isolation is used to protect against electric shock, to suppress electrical noise in sensitive devices, or to transfer power between two circuits which must not be connected. A transformer sold for isolation is often built with special insulation between primary and secondary windings, and is specified to withstand a high voltage between windings.

Isolation transformers block transmission of the DC component in signals from one circuit to the other, but allow AC components in signals to pass. Transformers that have a ratio of 1 to 1 between the primary and secondary windings are often used to protect secondary circuits and individuals from electrical shocks between energized conductors and earth ground. Suitably designed isolation transformers block interference caused by ground loops. Isolation transformers with electrostatic shields are used for power supplies for sensitive equipment such as computers, medical devices, or laboratory instruments.

Some specifications require that Isolation transformers be a part of the lightning protection on the AC circuits.

== Terminology ==
Sometimes the term is used to emphasize that a device is not an autotransformer whose primary and secondary circuits are connected. Power transformers with specified insulation between primary and secondary are not usually described only as "isolation transformers" unless this is their primary function. Only transformers whose primary purpose is to isolate circuits are routinely described as isolation transformers.

== Operation ==
Isolation transformers are designed with attention to capacitive coupling between the two windings. The capacitance between primary and secondary windings would also couple AC current from the primary to the secondary. A grounded Faraday shield between the primary and the secondary greatly reduces the coupling of common-mode noise. This may be another winding or a metal strip surrounding a winding. Differential noise can magnetically couple from the primary to the secondary of an isolation transformer, and must be filtered out if a problem occurs.

== Applications ==
=== Pulse transformers ===
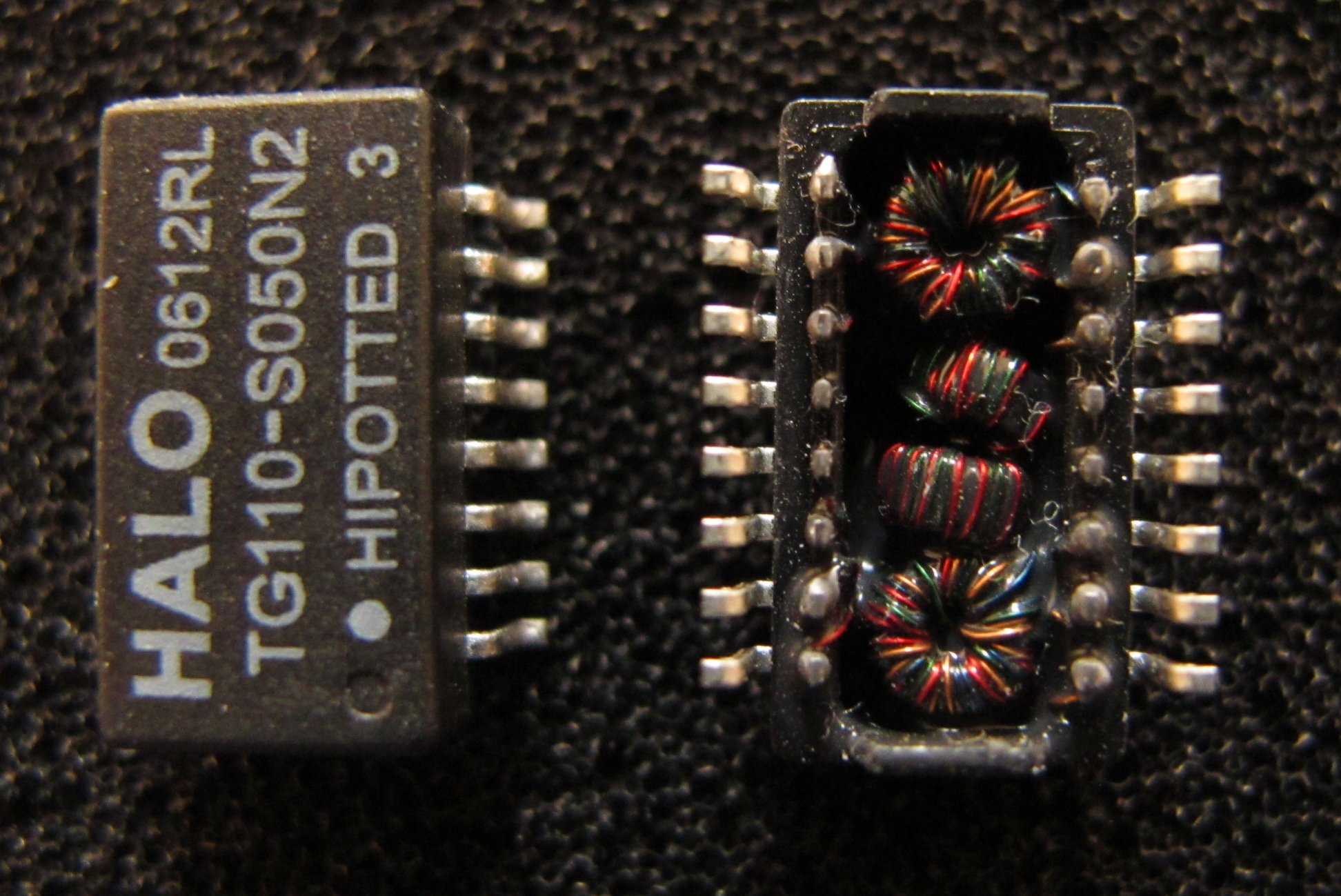
Halo TG110-S050N2RL 10/100BASE-TX Ethernet pulse transformer in SO-16 package

Some small transformers are used for isolation in pulse circuits.

=== Electronics testing ===
In electronics testing and servicing, an isolation transformer is a 1:1 (under load) power transformer used for safety. Without it, exposed live metal in a device under test is at a hazardous voltage relative to grounded objects such as a heating radiator or oscilloscope ground lead (a particular hazard with some old vacuum-tube equipment with live chassis). With the transformer, as there is no conductive connection between transformer secondary and primary, only a small leakage current will flow if the exposed live metal is connected to earth.

Even if an isolation transformer is used, hazardous voltages may still be present between components of the isolated device. Thus it is still possible for an operator to be exposed to lethal voltages by touching multiple elements in the circuit. An isolation transformer provides maximum protection when the device is ungrounded. Connecting it to test equipment, for example, an oscilloscope or a benchtop multimeter, may ground the circuit.

Electrical isolation is considered to be particularly important on medical equipment, and special standards apply. Often the system must additionally be designed so that fault conditions do not interrupt power, but generate a warning.

=== Supply of equipment at elevated potentials ===
Isolation transformers are also used for the power supply of devices not at ground potential. An example is the Austin transformer for the power supply of air-traffic obstacle warning lamps on radio antenna masts. Without the isolation transformer, the lighting circuits on the mast would conduct radio-frequency energy to ground through the power supply.

== See also ==
- Balun
- Power quality
- Transformer types
- Zigzag transformer
