= Arthur O. Austin =

American electrical engineer (1879–1964)

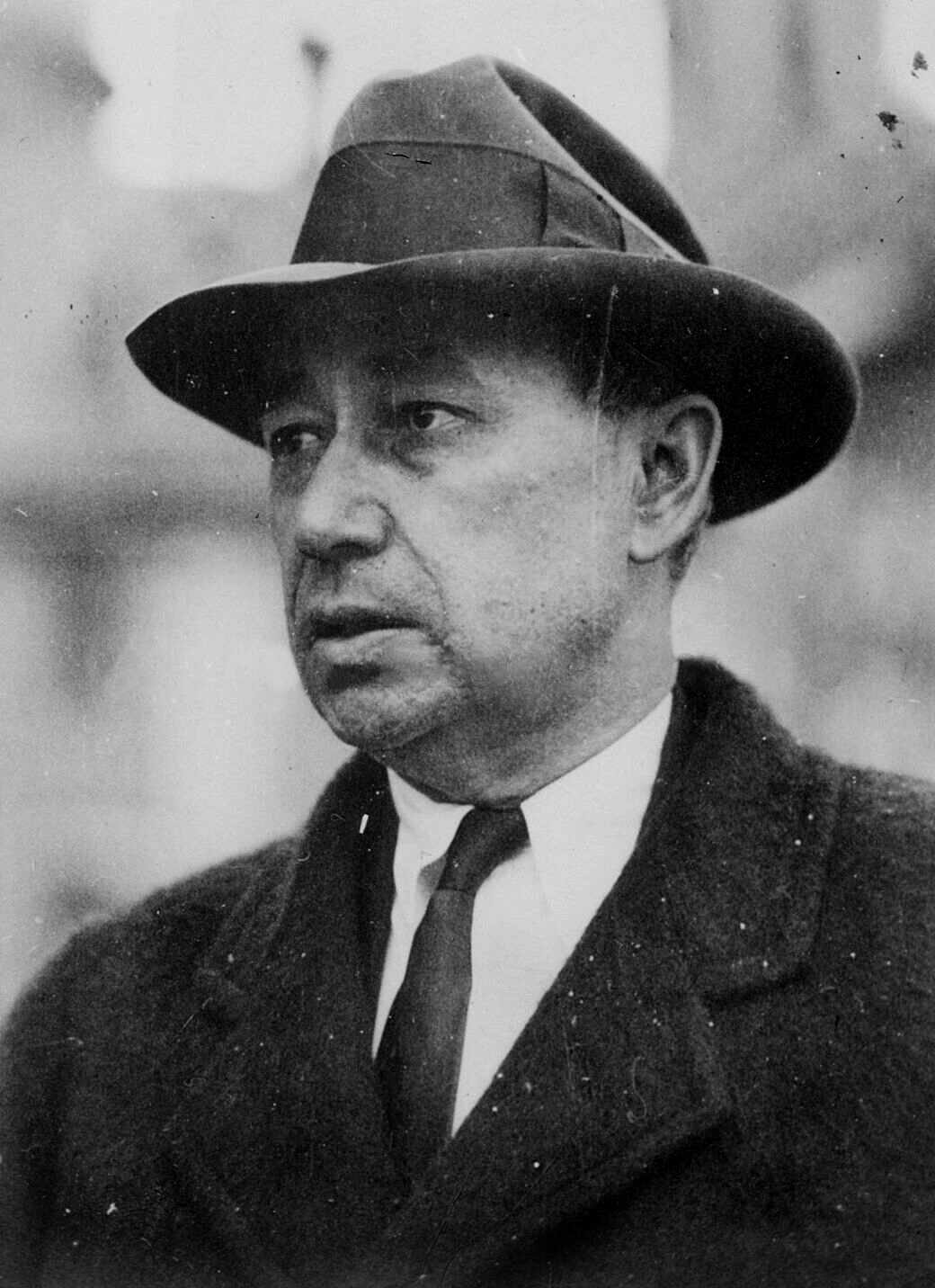
- Austin in 1933
- Born: December 28, 1879; Stockton, California, U.S.
- Died: June 7, 1964 (aged 84); Barberton, Ohio, U.S.
- Education: Stanford University (BS)
- Spouses: Eleanor Briggs (m. 1907; died 1919); Augusta Briggs (m. 1921)
- Children: 2
- Engineering career
- Discipline: Electrical
- Significant design: Austin transformer

Arthur Oswin Austin (December 28, 1879 – June 7, 1964) was an American electrical engineer and inventor. He is the inventor of the Austin transformer, a double-ring toroidal transformer used to supply power for lighting circuits on radio towers. Austin's research included improvements to radio transmission equipment and the effects of lightning on high-voltage transmission lines and aircraft. He was a fellow of the American Institute of Electrical Engineers and of the Institute of Radio Engineers, and was an expert in high-voltage insulators and fittings. His work on transmitting antennas included both military and civilian projects.

A native of California, Austin graduated from Leland Stanford University with a degree in electrical engineering. He lived for a few years in New York, where he worked for General Electric and the Lima Insulator Company, but spent most of his adult life in Ohio where he married, worked for the Ohio Brass Company and founded the Austin Insulator Company. He bought a large estate in Barberton, Ohio, lived in the mansion, and built an extensive outdoor electrical laboratory on the grounds.

== Career ==
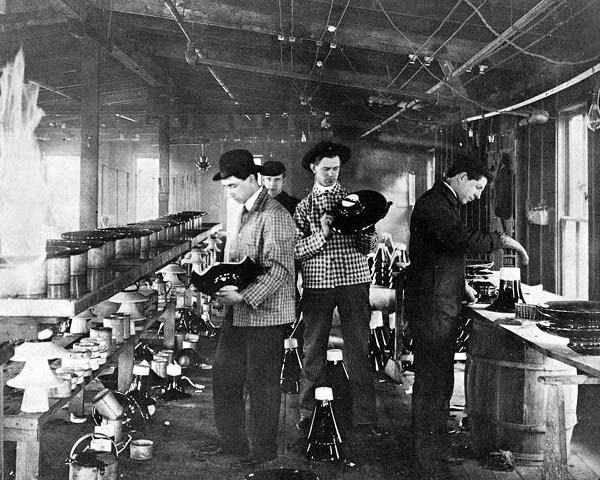
Austin (center foreground) in a lab in 1905, probably at either General Electric or Pacific Gas and Electric

After graduating from college in 1903, Austin worked for General Electric in Schenectady, New York. He left General Electric in 1904 and worked for Stanley Electric Company in Pittsfield, Massachusetts for a short time. He was hired by Pacific Gas and Electric, initially acting as their eastern representative doing electric insulator testing, and then moving to the company's San Francisco office in 1905. In 1906, he moved to Lima, New York, to work for the Lima Insulator Company, serving as manager and chief engineer. The company's factory was destroyed by fire in 1908, after which Austin moved to Ohio to work for Akron Hi-Potential Porcelain Company. Akron Porcelain became a subsidiary of the Ohio Brass Company which in turn was purchased by Hubbell in 1978.

During the First World War, the US Navy planned work on a military radio facility in Monroe, North Carolina, using arc converter transmitters produced by the Federal Telegraph Company, generating approximately 1 MW of power. Ohio Brass was contracted to supply the antenna insulators, with Austin assigned to the project. The war ended before Federal could deliver the arc converters and the station was never built.

Austin invented an electrically heated, oil filled porcelain insulator used to support radio transmission towers. Previous porcelain insulator designs had sufficient mechanical strength and electrical insulation for their intended purpose, but could be fragile enough that a tower might be brought down by a vandal with a .22 caliber rifle. Austin's design used a porcelain tube in combination with a bakelite sleeve, the latter having sufficient strength to support the tower if the porcelain was damaged. The porcelain was kept under compression, increasing its strength. The assembly was filled with oil kept warm by a 120-watt electric heater; a thermostat kept the exterior of the insulator above the dew point, preventing moisture from condensing on its surface which would result in leakage of radio frequency (RF) energy. The resistance to condensation in damp weather led Spokane, Washington's radio station KHQ to use this type of insulator in their 826-foot (252 m) 5,000 watt transmission tower which the Spokesman-Review described in 1945 as "the tallest self-supporting tower in the world".

Austin invented an insulated perch which prevented birds from resting on electrical transmission line insulator strings and was granted a patent on the invention in 1928. Austin was a fellow of both the American Institute of Electrical Engineers and the Institute of Radio Engineers. He was a member of several other professional societies, including the American Ceramic Society, the American Society for Testing Materials, the American Electric Chemical Society, the Sigma Xi scientific fraternity and the National Academy of Science.

=== WHK transmitter antenna ===
U.S. Patent 1,968,868 for an insulated radio tower

In the late 1920s, AM radio station WHK in Cleveland, Ohio was investigating ways to improve their signal coverage. Chief engineer E. L. Grove believed that the station's poor signal coverage was due to the effect of other steel-frame buildings in the vicinity of their transmitter site atop a downtown office building, poor grounding, and power loss from the antenna's support towers. After obtaining permission from the Federal Radio Commission, a new transmitter was built on a hill nine miles south of the city, leaving the studio downtown. Grove consulted with the Ohio Brass Company, where Austin was the chief engineer. A plan was devised to build a transmitting tower in several sections, with each section isolated from the others by insulators, eliminating the parasitic electrical currents induced in the steel structure by the antenna's radiating element. Austin had previously worked on sectionalized high-tension power line towers and held a patent on that design.

Some radio stations had already built towers which were insulated from the ground, but WHK's design was the first to use insulators in the tower itself, dividing it into multiple isolated sections. In addition to the structural insulators, the tower included special ladders with "jack knife" sections at the insulated joints; during transmitter operation, the ladder sections were kept open to preserve the electrical isolation, but could be closed to allow workers to climb the tower for maintenance. During initial testing, the 1,000 watt WHK signal could be heard in New Zealand whereas the previous transmitter, with the same power level, was not even audible throughout all of Cleveland. Austin was granted U.S patent 1,968,868 for this tower design.

Tower lighting was provided by gas carried through copper pipes which transitioned to non-conductive porcelain tubes at the tower joints. A 1932 article in Radio Engineering magazine described the use of gas lighting in towers consisting of multiple electrically isolated segments as in the WHK design, stating that electrical lighting would be impractical due to the need for isolation transformers at every insulating joint. The author speculated that external floodlighting, neon tubes driven from the radiated RF energy, or wind generators might all be practical alternatives to the use of gas.

=== Austin transformer ===
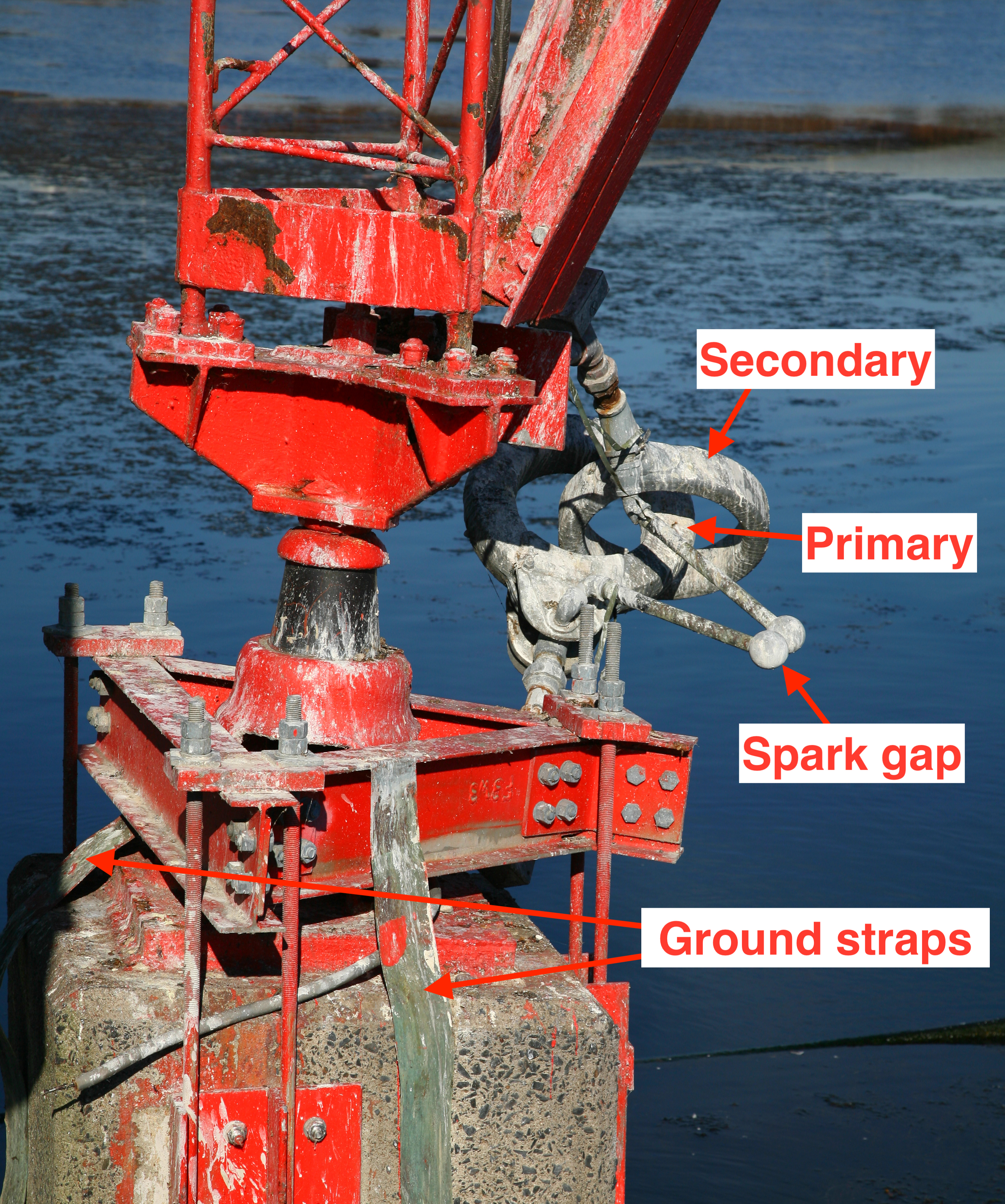
Example of an Austin transformer at the base of a radio tower

Austin invented the Austin ring transformer, a type of toroidal transformer with an air gap providing radio frequency isolation between the primary and secondary windings while passing 50/60 Hz power. These are used at the bases of radio transmission towers to allow electrical power to be fed to the tower lights without interfering with the radio-frequency feed. The primary winding is mounted on the ground or on the tower's foundation, with the secondary on the energized tower structure. The windings are usually at right angles to each other and oriented so rain water can drip off the secondary without hitting the primary ring. If an optional lightning protection spark gap is installed, it is oriented with the arc path horizontal, so as to make the arc self-extinguishing.

Austin ring transformers are well suited for use on towers which are approximately one half wavelength tall. This type of tower will have a large base impedance leading to high voltages across the base insulators which make choke-type power feeds impractical. The large air gap between the primary and secondary windings results in a low coupling capacitance and high breakdown voltage.

The 1971 Austin Insulator product catalog listed 21 standard types with power ratings from 0.7 to 7.0 kVA weighing 70–340 pounds (32–154 kg), with the larger units only available on special order. Despite Austin having been issued a large number of patents, there are no known patents on this particular invention. Patrick Warr of Austin Insulators was quoted by Radio World:

I'm not aware that there was ever any patent. There was a story related to me by my predecessors when I first came to work here. It seems that Arthur Austin was happily making ring transformers when he was approached by Hughey and Phillips, a company based somewhere around Los Angeles that was into several types of lighting. Austin told them he wasn't interested in the West Coast market, as he had enough to do in Ohio, and told them how to make the transformer, and to "go ahead and make it."

== Personal life ==
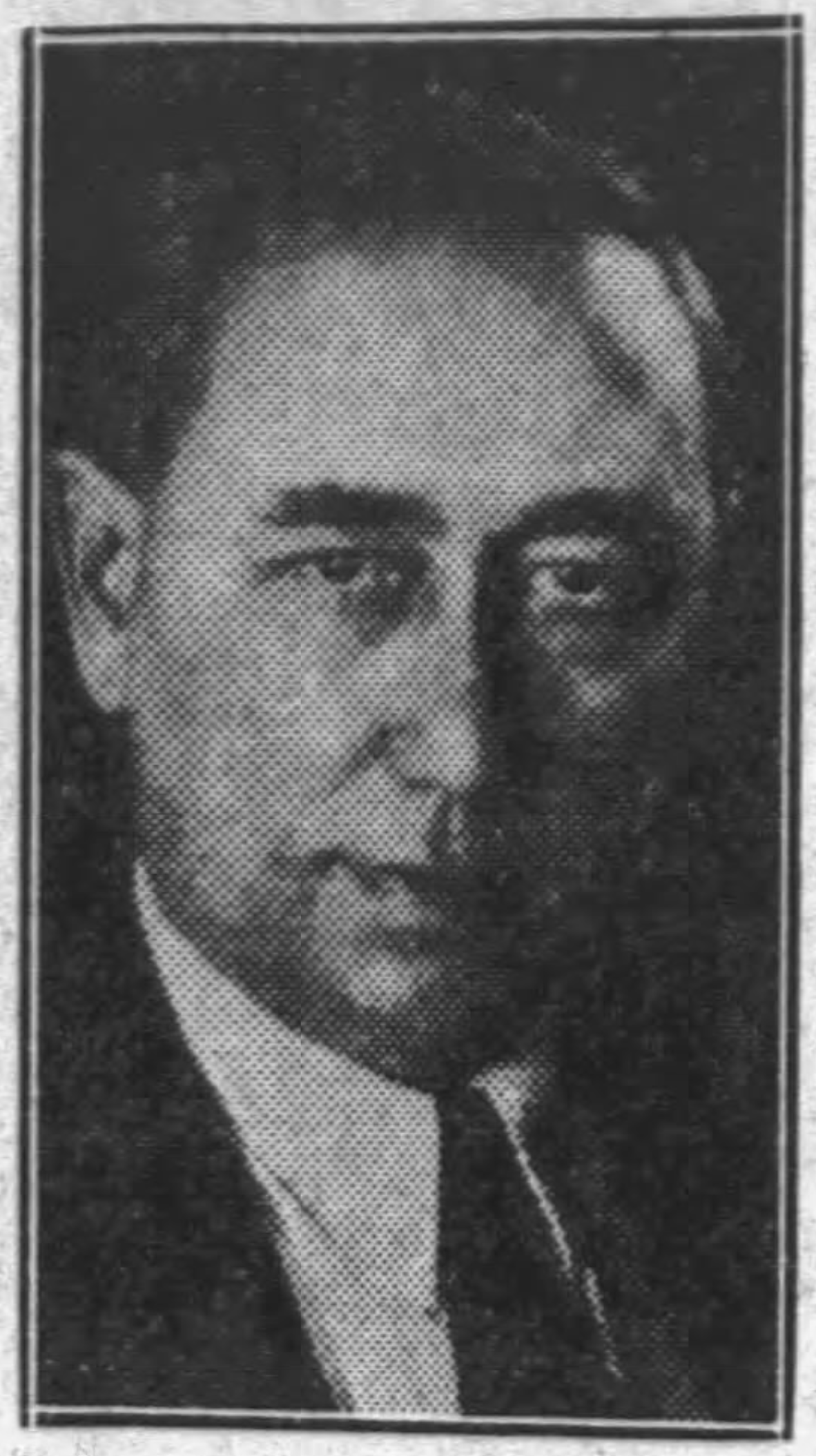
Austin in undated photo, 1928 or earlier

Arthur Oswin Austin (who preferred to be called A. O. Austin) was born on December 28, 1879, in Stockton, California, to Oswin Alonzo and Mary Louisa Austin. He attended high school in Stockton then went to Leland Stanford University, graduating in 1903 with a Bachelors of Arts degree in electrical engineering.

Austin married Eleanor Briggs on December 28, 1907, in New York City. In 1919, Eleanor was killed (and Arthur injured) in an automobile accident on Massachusetts's Mohawk Trail. Two years later, Austin married Eleanor's sister Augusta in Los Gatos, California; the couple had two daughters, Barbara and Martha. Austin had a brother, Edward, who worked on building Ohio Brass's manufacturing facility in Niagara Falls, Ontario.

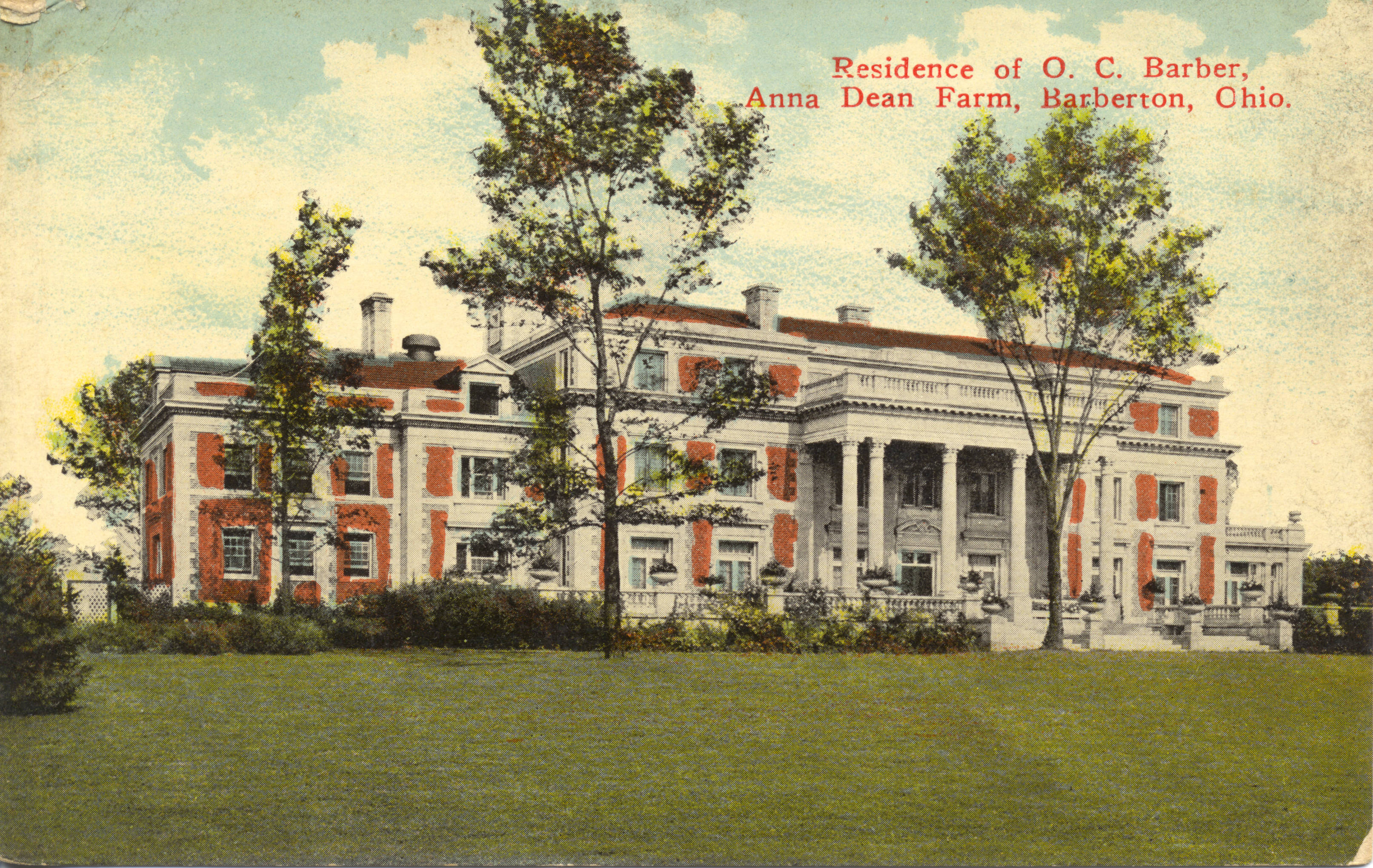
O. C. Barber mansion

By the 1920s, Austin was a wealthy man. In 1926, he purchased 275 acres from the estate of O. C. Barber in Barberton, Ohio, for an undisclosed price. The parcel included the Barber mansion, the gate house, and several barns and other buildings. Construction was of red brick, white concrete block, royal blue trim, and red terra cotta tile roofs. The house, which had gold-leaf ceilings, was described in 2005 by the Akron Beacon Journal as having 52 rooms, "a breathtaking vista from its east-side perch", and being "the most opulent residence between New York City and Chicago". The house was surrounded by 35 ancillary buildings including barns.

Austin died at the age of 84 on June 7, 1964, in Barberton after a two-month illness. The Akron Beacon Journal described him in an obituary as "one of the foremost electrical experts of the century". After his death, his heirs were unable to maintain the estate. There was an effort on the part of the Barberton community to preserve the property for its historic value, but funding could not be secured and the house was torn down. It was estimated at the time that upkeep of the mansion cost $3,000 (equivalent to $30,600 in 2025) per month.

In addition to his professional activities, Austin was involved in a number of civic duties. He was a director of the Barberton Citizens Hospital, a charter member of the local chamber of commerce (serving as president in 1928) and the Barberton Rotary Club (serving as president in 1941–1942). He was a Republican, a Mason and a member of the Order of the Eastern Star, and a member of the First United Presbyterian Church of Barberton. His hobbies included photography and gardening. As of 2024 the Barberton Community Foundation manages the A.O. Austin Engineering Scholarship Fund, awarded to Barberton students seeking post-secondary engineering degrees.

== High-voltage laboratories ==
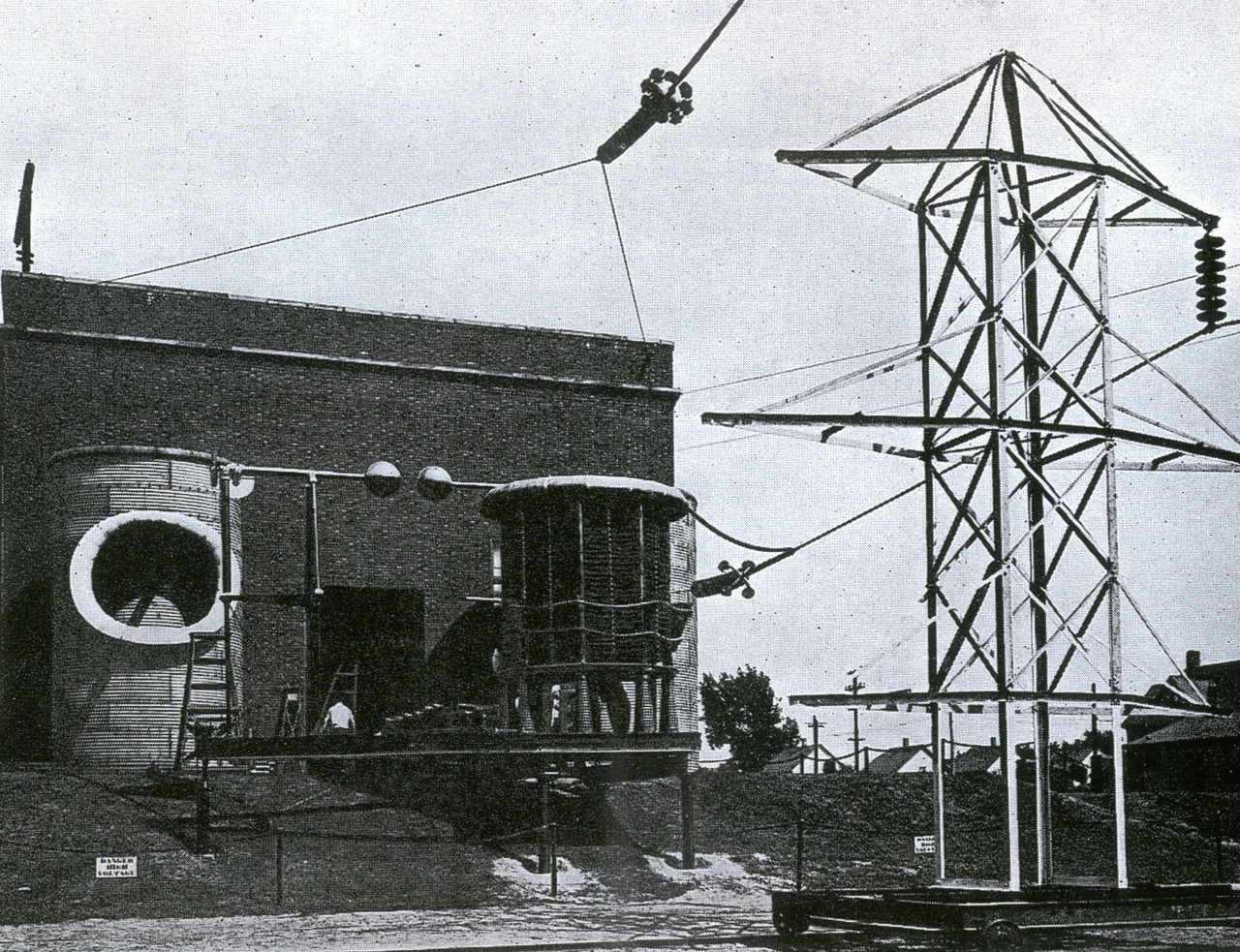
Ohio Insulator Company high voltage lab number 1, Park & 9th Streets in Barberton, Ohio

Between 1910 and 1968, the Ohio Insulator Company (which later changed its name to Ohio Brass) built a series of four high-voltage testing labs, with Austin being involved in the first two. The need for such a lab had been driven by the increase in voltages used for electrical transmission. Lines running at 25 kV were typical in 1891 but by the early 1920s lines were commonly running at 220 kV and it was not yet fully understood how these lines would be affected by storms, rain, fog, or snow. The high voltages necessitated physically large equipment and clearances, which meant the labs could no longer fit inside buildings and had to be built outdoors.

The first lab was built in 1910. In 1926, Austin built another outdoor electrical testing laboratory on the grounds of the Barber estate. In operation until 1933, this was the second of the four high-voltage labs established by Ohio Brass. It has been described as, "a juxtaposition of Victorian elegance and high-tech equipment". Equipment included four iron-core, 60 Hz transformers manufactured by Allis-Chalmers, rated at 2.2 kV input, 600 kV output. By over-exciting the transformers, Austin was able to increase the output rating to 750 kV and produced up to 900 kV in tests. R. P. Cronin of the Sandusky Register wrote that these were connected in series and were "three of the largest transformers in the world". A capacitor and synchronous switch was used to produce a transient overvoltage and a spark across a sphere gap which could be applied to objects being studied. A 1933 newspaper report wrote about the lab:

The courtyard of the laboratory, where most of the experiments have been conducted, is a weird place, filled with cage-like structural towers, and dominated by three mammoth transformers. From an insulated ball suspended in the air, at Austin's will 30-foot flashes of lightning leap to the ground with a crack like a rifle shot.

The space available on the Barber estate was outgrown by 1933 and in 1934, the third lab was built by Ohio Brass adjacent to their factory. In 1968, the fourth lab, which includes a 5000 kV impulse generator, was built in Wadsworth, Ohio. As of 2024 it operates as Hubbell's Frank B. Black Research Center, named in honor of Ohio Brass's founder.

=== Effects of lightning on aircraft ===
Austin used his lab to experiment with the effects of lightning on aircraft, both airplanes and lighter-than-air airships from the Goodyear Zeppelin Corporation with his research leading to methods of protecting aircraft from these strikes. Austin's interest in this area stemmed from a 1929 Transcontinental Air Transport crash. In 1930 Popular Mechanics described the lab as "the most powerful outdoor high-voltage laboratory in the world". The article observed that aircraft lightning strikes had not previously been a major problem because there were few planes and most would stay on the ground during thunderstorms but the increasing popularity of air travel would make lightning a greater hazard.

Preliminary experiments at the Barber estate lab were done on scale models of airplanes. The models were hit by artificial lightning strikes measuring millions of volts and hundreds of thousands of amps. These experiments showed that lightning would typically enter and leave the plane at projecting points on the structure; the two points might be the opposite wingtips, the propeller and the tail skid, or other pairs. In one experiment, the pitot tube was struck. The hot engine exhaust gas did not appear to attract strikes, contrary to speculation that it would.

Later tests used a full-sized Barling NB-3, a monoplane with a fabric-covered all-metal frame which had been provided to Austin by Popular Mechanics for testing. The plane was subjected to repeated lightning strikes while on the ground. Additional tests on the plane's LeBlond 60 engine showed that it would continue to run at idle speed after being struck. Lightning strikes on the tip of the rudder resulted in small holes burned through the fabric covering where it contacted the duralumin frame. Austin's experiments showed bare sheet metal was undamaged by lightning strikes, and only minor damage was caused when the metal was covered by fabric. As of 1930, when these findings were published by Popular Mechanics, additional experiments were planned to investigate the effect of lightning on fuel tanks, the engine crankcase, flight instruments, and control cables.

== Austin Insulator Company ==
In 1933, Austin started the A. O. Austin Insulator Company. After Austin's death in 1964, the company passed through a number of ownership changes, being at various times part of Decca Navigator Company (a division of Decca Records). Racal-Decca, and Litton Marine. The purchase by Decca in 1971 was accompanied by a move to the Decca Radar plant in Toronto, Canada. Decca had previously been a customer and relied on the specialized insulators which Austin provided; to ensure the continued availability of these components, Decca bought the company.

As of 2024, the company has undergone additional changes of ownership and is being run as an independent company known as Austin Insulators Inc. The company's main products are high-voltage insulators and transformers mostly used by the radio transmission industry. Insulator strings of the "safety core" type with mechanical ratings up to 1,000,000 pounds (450,000 kg) are available.
