= Direct-coupled amplifier =

Type of electronic amplifier

A direct-coupled amplifier or DC amplifier is a type of amplifier in which the output of one stage of the amplifier is coupled to the input of the next stage in such a way as to permit signals with zero frequency, also referred to as direct current, to pass from input to output. This is an application of the more general direct coupling. It was invented by Harold J Paz and Francis P. Keiper Jr. in 1955. It displaced the triode vacuum tube amplifier designed by Lee de Forest. Almost all vacuum tube circuit designs are now replaced with direct coupled transistor circuit design. It is the first transistor amplifier design that did not include coupling capacitors. The direct-coupled amplifier allowed analog circuits to be built smaller with the elimination of coupling capacitors and removed the lower frequency limitation that is dependent on capacitors.

== History ==
Paz first started his career at Bell Labs as an intern from December 1950 to April 1952 as an Engineering Aid. Paz worked on testing several transistor parameters, such as rise time, RC timing constant, alpha coefficient, to determine their effects on a transistor circuit design. He then went on to work at RCA as a summer student engineering intern from June 1953 to September 1953. Paz was assigned to determine the effects of several variables on a transistor's noise factor at various radio frequencies. It was the result of this research that Paz designed the first transistor-based wireless microphone, called Phantom. RCA took interest in Paz's design and made their subsidiary National Broadcasting Company aware of the new microphone. RCA decided to file patent US2,810,110 for the microphone on July 16, 1954 and was granted on October 15, 1957. The design was used for the ND-433 wireless microphone that NBC used in 1955.

It was In June 1954, that Paz took an engineering position at Philco and was assigned to the Transistor Product Engineering Group to study the theory of operation of the direct-coupled switching circuits of R. Brown. The switching circuited used one resistor per transistor, which was revolutionary at the time for its low component count. Transistors were primarily used to be an on-off digital device that would be beneficial for making a solid-state digital computer. It was after understanding the theory of the switching circuits that Paz invented the direct-coupled "Triplet", which is a three-stage linear amplifier which uses only one resistor per transistor amplification stage. It was during this time that Paz was introduced to Robert Noyce, who was also in the Transistor Research Department. The direct-coupled amplifier was influential in the development of Fairchild's uA709 operational amplifier by Bob Widlar, which Noyce knew about as he was one of the founders of Fairchild Semiconductors.

The direct-coupled amplifier is also the basis for Philco's Mark I hearing aid, which used the circuit built with silicon alloy transistors. The hearing aid was listed as Figure 5 as an application of the Triplet on the US3030586 patent

Afterwards, Paz returned to work at RCA in August 1955. He worked on designing a power supply that used small transistors which could regulate and control a large amount of power. This research resulted in new circuitry that Paz designed and was featured in RCA's internal academic journal, the Industry Service Laboratory. Paz later on published his design with the International Radio Engineers and presented his findings at the IRE convention in 1957.

Paz continued working on various transistor amplifier designs for RCA, including a transistor circuit design that could be used in the rack mounted amplifier product line. This transistor circuit became a transistor preamplifier equalizer for professional turntables. Paz submitted his paper at the 1957 Annual Audio Engineering Convention. Additional products include the "hybrid" transistor power amplifier, which was the first 10 watt amplifier which had less than 0.333% distortion from 30 cycles to 15,000 cycles. It was also compatible to be used with any RCA 2N301 power transistors. The low distortion transistor power amplifier was published in the Electronics Industries magazine and Paz presented his findings at the National Convention of IRE in 1959.

== Current ==
The common use of the term "DC amplifier" does not mean "direct current amplifier", as this type can be used for both direct current and alternating current signals. The frequency response of the direct coupled amplifier is similar to low pass filter and hence it is also known as "Low-Pass Amplifier". The amplification of DC (zero frequency) is possible only by this amplifier, hence it later becomes the building block for differential amplifier and operational amplifier. Furthermore, monolithic integrated circuit technology does not allow the fabrication of large coupling capacitors.

== Drift ==
Direct-coupled amplifiers constructed in the conventional form of single-ended amplifiers connected in cascade suffer from drift of the output voltage with time and temperature. In many high-gain applications it is necessary to provide offset adjustments to deal with drift. The drift problem can be overcome by using differential amplifiers.

== Application ==
Direct-coupled amplifiers are used in voltage regulators, servo drives and other instrumentation amplifiers. It also forms a building block for differential amplifiers and operational amplifiers.

== See also ==
- Capacitive coupling
