= AF107 =

European name for an early germanium-based bipolar junction transistor

The AF107 is the European name for an early (c. 1960) germanium-based (A) bipolar junction transistor of PNP polarity intended for high frequency use (F). It shares most of its characteristics with the AF108. Both models use a non-standard round metallic housing of 9 millimetre diameter which is electrically connected to the collector. At a housing temperature of 45 °C, these transistors can handle an internal power dissipation of 0.5 watt. Unit gain (β = 1) is reached at typically 250 MHz (minimum 150 MHz).
