= Net gain =

Net gain may refer to:

- Net gain (telecommunications), the overall gain of a transmission circuit
- Net (economics)
- Net profit
- Net income
- "Net Gains", a season 3 episode of The Loud House
