= Triple-twin =

Electronic vacuum tube

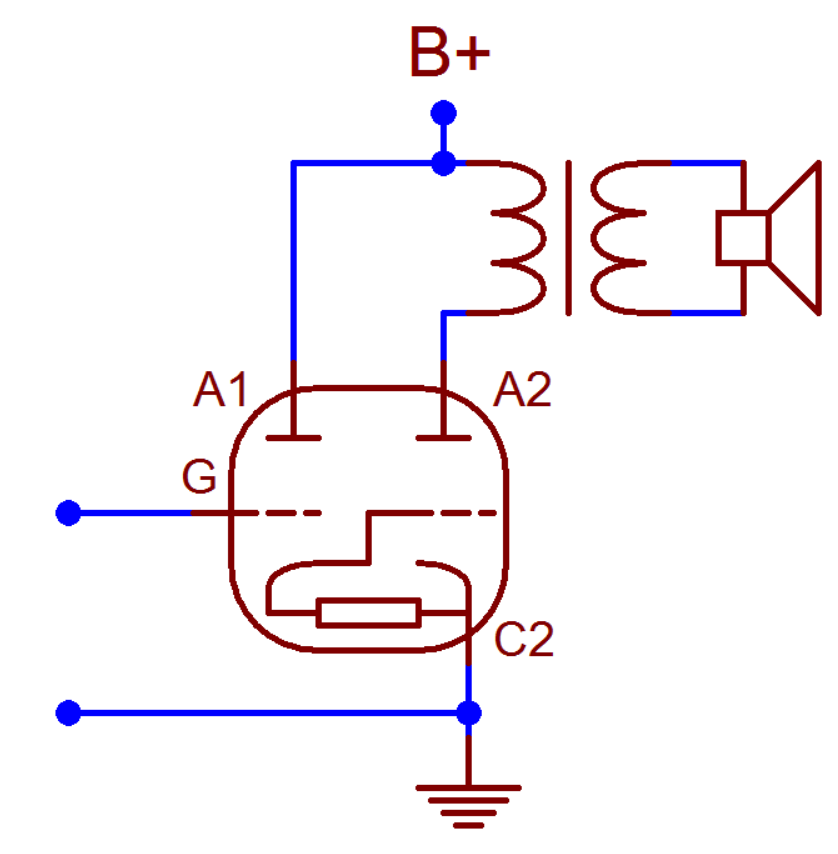
The 6N6G triple-twin tube enabled building a fully-functional audio amplifier with just two parts: the tube and the output transformer

The Triple-twin was a type of double vacuum triode for audio power amplifiers. A triple-twin contained two dissimilar, directly coupled triodes in a common envelope. To maximize power yield, the output triode was intended to be positively biased, and thus required substantial grid current. This current was supplied by the input triode, configured as a cathode follower. The cathode of the input triode was hard-wired to the control grid of the output triode inside the envelope.

The first tube of the family, type 295, was introduced by Cable Radio Tube Corporation under the Speed label in March 1932. The company advertised 295 as being twice as powerful as the type 47 pentode, and three times as powerful as the type 45 directly heated triode (the most common output tube of the period) - hence the name triple-twin. Maximum output power reached 4,5 W at 5% distortion into 4 kOhm load; at 2 kOhm and 10 kOhm loads distortion increased to 8%. The 295 required +250 V plate voltage, and around +6 V positive grid bias.

The original type 295 had a directly heated output section, and an indirectly heated input section. The 2B6 tube, introduced in 1933, had similar power ratings, but had both cathodes indirectly heated. The Sylvania 6N6G, introduced in 1936, had both cathodes indirectly heated, and also had the cathode follower resistor hard-wired inside the envelope. A single-ended 6N6G amplifier required only one external component, the output transformer; currents and bias voltages were set by the internal resistor. A push-pull 6N6G amplifier required only two tubes and two transformers (input and output).

Despite massive advertising, the triple-twin was a market failure. The industry preferred general-purpose tube types, and the triple-twin was obsolete by the end of the 1930s.
