= DC block =

Electronic component

- Component type: Passive
- Working principle: Direct Current

Electronic symbol
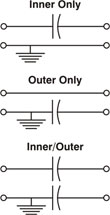

DC blocks are coaxial components that prevent the flow of audio and direct current (DC) frequencies while offering minimum interference to RF signals. There are three basic forms of DC blocks. "Inner only" models have a capacitor in series with the center conductor, "outer only" models have a capacitor in series with the outer conductor, and "inner/outer" models have capacitors in series with both the inner and outer conductors. The insulation material on the outer models is non-conductive. Applications include ground loop elimination, signal source modulation leakage suppression, system signal-to-noise ratio improvement, test setup isolation and other situations where undesired DC or audio current flows in the system.

== See also ==
- Bias tee
- Choke (electronics)
- DC-blocking capacitor
