= Coupling (electronics) =

Transfer of energy between circuits

In electronics, electric power and telecommunication, coupling is the transfer of electrical energy from one circuit to another, or between parts of a circuit. Coupling can be deliberate as part of the function of the circuit, or it may be undesirable, for instance due to coupling to stray fields. For example, energy is transferred from a power source to an electrical load by means of conductive coupling, which may be either resistive or direct coupling. An AC potential may be transferred from one circuit segment to another having a DC potential by use of a capacitor. Electrical energy may be transferred from one circuit segment to another segment with different impedance by use of a transformer; this is known as impedance matching. These are examples of electrostatic and electrodynamic inductive coupling.

== Types ==
Electrical conduction:

- Direct coupling, also called conductive coupling and galvanic coupling
- Resistive conduction
- Atmospheric plasma channel coupling

Electromagnetic induction:

- Electrodynamic induction — commonly called inductive coupling, also magnetic coupling
- Capacitive coupling
- Evanescent wave coupling

Electromagnetic radiation:

- Radio waves — Wireless telecommunications.
- Electromagnetic interference (EMI) — Sometimes called radio frequency interference (RFI), is unwanted coupling. Electromagnetic compatibility (EMC) requires techniques to avoid such unwanted coupling, such as electromagnetic shielding.
- Microwave power transmission

Other kinds of energy coupling:

- Acoustic coupler

== See also ==
- Antenna noise temperature
- Coupling loss
- Aperture-to-medium coupling loss
- Coupling coefficient of resonators
- Directional coupler
- Equilibrium length
- Optocoupler
- Fiber-optic coupling
- Loading coil
- Shield
- List of electronics topics
- AC Coupling
- Impedance matching
- Impedance bridging
- Decoupling
- Crosstalk
- Wireless power transfer
