= Obstacle Collision Avoidance System =

The Obstacle Collision Avoidance System (OCAS) is designed to alert pilots if their aircraft is in immediate danger of flying into an obstacle. OCAS uses a low power ground-based radar to provide detection and tracking of an aircraft's proximity to an obstacle such as high buildings, power line crossings, telecom towers or wind turbines. This capability allows the visual warning lights to remain passive until an aircraft is detected and known to be tracking on an unsafe heading.

OCAS is currently the only FAA approved Audio Visual Warning System (AVWS) approved in the National Airspace. OCAS is also the only AVWS approved by the International Dark Sky Association.

OCAS is operational in the US, Canada, Norway and Germany. OCAS developer was acquired by Vestas in 2011.

== Overview ==
The OCAS system is designed to protect obstacles that are vulnerable to low flying aircraft. OCAS detects the ground speed, heading and altitude of approaching aircraft and determines whether it will adequately clear the obstacle. A configurable set of rules is applied to define and determine when to warn the aircraft, by which warning device and signal depending on the calculated time to impact with the obstacle.

Initial Warning – Medium Intensity Lighting: Once the initial threshold is met, the visual warning is activated. This capability allows the lighting system to remain passive (in the off position) the vast majority of the time thus preserving the dark sky environment while adhering to strict safety standards set out by the FAA.

Secondary Warning – Audio Broadcast: If the initial warning does not result in the pilot altering the flight path, a programmable VHF radio broadcasts an additional obstruction warning directly to the cockpit. The VHF warning frequencies are adjusted based on local requirements.

== See also ==
- Aviation obstruction lighting
