= Direct coupling =

Conductive electrical connection

In electronics, direct coupling or DC coupling (also called conductive coupling and galvanic coupling) is the transfer of electrical energy by means of physical contact via a conductive medium, in contrast to inductive coupling and capacitive coupling. It is a way of interconnecting two circuits such that, in addition to transferring the AC signal (or information), the first circuit also provides DC bias to the second. Thus, DC blocking capacitors are not used or needed to interconnect the circuits. Conductive coupling passes the full spectrum of frequencies including direct current.

Such coupling may be achieved by a wire, resistor, or common terminal, such as a binding post or metallic bonding.

== DC bias ==
The provision of DC bias only occurs in a group of circuits that forms a single unit, such as an op-amp. Here the internal units or portions of the op-amp (like the input stage, voltage gain stage, and output stage) will be direct coupled and will also be used to set up the bias conditions inside the op-amp (the input stage will also supply the input bias to the voltage gain stage, for example). However, when two op-amps are directly coupled the first op-amp will supply any bias to the next – any DC at its output will form the input for the next. The resulting output of the second op-amp now represents an offset error if it is not the intended one.

== Uses ==
This technique is used by default in circuits like IC op-amps, since large coupling capacitors cannot be fabricated on-chip. That said, some discrete circuits (such as power amplifiers) also employ direct coupling to cut cost and improve low frequency performance.

== Offset error ==
One advantage or disadvantage (depending on application) of direct coupling is that any DC at the input appears as a valid signal to the system, and so it will be transferred from the input to the output (or between two directly coupled circuits). If this is not a desired result, then the term used for the output signal is output offset error, and the corresponding input signal is known as input offset error.

=== Error correction ===
Temperature drift and device mismatches are the major causes of offset errors, and circuits employing direct coupling often integrate offset nulling mechanisms. Some circuits (like power amplifiers) even use coupling capacitors—except that these are present only at the input (and/or output) of the whole system but not between the individual circuit units inside the system.

== Advantages ==
The advantage of direct coupling is very good low frequency response, often from DC to the highest operating frequency that the system will allow. All applications that require monitoring of slowly changing signals (such as those from thermistors, thermocouples, strain gages, etc.) must have a very good DC amplification with minimum offset errors and hence they must be directly coupled throughout, and have offset correction or trimming incorporated into them.

== See also ==
- Direct-coupled amplifier
- Electromagnetic compatibility
- Electromagnetic interference
- Galvanic isolation
- Ohmic contact
