= Complex gain =

In electronics, the concept of gain is the amount a electrical system changes the magnitude of an input signal. The complex gain is the effect that circuitry has on not only the amplitude but also the phase of a sine wave signal. Such an input signal can pass through an electric circuit that increases the magnitude and for example take differing amounts of time, or intentionally be phase shifted with electrical components. The term complex arises from complex numbers and there usefulness in expressing wave phenomena via Euler's formula.

== LTI systems ==
Considering the general LTI system

$$P(D)x = Q(D)f(t)$$

where $f(t)$ is the input and $P(D), Q(D)$ are given polynomial operators, while assuming that $P(s)\neq 0$. In case that $f(r) = F_0\cos(\omega t)$, a particular solution to given equation is

$$x_p(t) = \operatorname{Re}\Big ( F_0 \frac{Q(i\omega)}{P(i\omega)}e^{i\omega t}\Big).$$

Consider the following concepts used in physics and signal processing mainly.

$\bullet$ The amplitude of the input is $F_0$. This has the same units as the input quantity.
$\bullet$ The angular frequency of the input is $\omega$. It has units of radian/time. Often we will be casual and refer to it as frequency, even though technically frequency should have units of cycles/time.

$\bullet$ The amplitude of the response is $A = F_0|Q(i\omega)/P(i\omega)|$. This has the same units as the response quantity.
$\bullet$ The gain is $g(\omega) = |Q(i\omega)/P (i\omega)|$. The gain is the factor that the input amplitude is multiplied by to get the amplitude of the response. It has the units needed to convert

input units to output units.

$\bullet$ The phase lag is $\phi = -\operatorname{Arg}(Q(i\omega)/P(i\omega))$. The phase lag has units of radians, i.e. it’s dimensionless.
$\bullet$ The time lag is $\phi / \omega$. This has units of time. It is the time that peak of the output lags behind that of the input.
$\bullet$ The complex gain is $Q(i\omega)/P(i\omega)$. This is the factor that the complex input is multiplied by to get the complex output.

== Example ==
Suppose a circuit has an input voltage described by the equation

$$V_{i}(t) = 1\ V \cdot \sin (\omega \cdot t)$$

where ω equals 2π×100 Hz, i.e., the input signal is a 100 Hz sine wave with an amplitude of 1 volt.

If the circuit is such that for this frequency it doubles the signal's amplitude and causes a 90 degrees forward phase shift, then its output signal can be described by

$$V_{o}(t) = 2\ V \cdot \cos (\omega \cdot t)$$

In complex notation, these signals can be described as, for this frequency, j·1 V and 2 V, respectively.

The complex gain G of this circuit is then computed by dividing output by input:

$$G = \frac {2\ V}{j\cdot1\ V} = -2j.$$

This (unitless) complex number incorporates both the magnitude of the change in amplitude (as the absolute value) and the phase change (as the argument).
