= Insertion gain =

In telecommunications, insertion gain is the gain resulting from the insertion of a device in a transmission line, expressed as the ratio of the signal power delivered to that part of the line following the device to the signal power delivered to that same part before insertion. Gains less than unity indicate insertion loss. Incident power is made of two part, the reflection from the device and the power absorbed by the device.

Insertion gain is usually expressed in decibels.
