= Coupling loss =

Energy loss between circuit components

Coupling loss, also known as connection loss, is the loss that occurs when energy is transferred from one circuit, circuit element, or medium to another. Coupling loss is usually expressed in the same units—such as watts or decibels—as in the originating circuit element or medium.

Coupling loss in fiber optics refers to the power loss that occurs when coupling light from one optical device or medium to another. (See also Optical return loss.)

Coupling losses can result from a number of factors. In electronics, impedance mismatch between coupled components results in a reflection of a portion of the energy at the interface. Likewise, in optical systems, where there is a change in index of refraction (most commonly at a fiber/air interface), a portion of the energy is reflected back into the source component.

Another major source of optical coupling loss is geometrical. As an example, two fibers coupled end-to-end may not be precisely aligned, with the result that the two cores overlap somewhat. Light exiting the source fiber at a portion of its core that is not aligned with the core of the receiving fiber will not (in general) be coupled into the second fiber. While some such light will be coupled into the second fiber, it is not likely to be efficiently coupled, nor will it generally travel in an appropriate mode in the second fiber.

Similarly, even for two perfectly aligned cores, where there is a gap of any significant distance between the two fibers, there will be some geometric loss due to spread of the beam. Some percentage of the light rays exiting the source fiber face will not intersect the second fiber within its entrance cone.
