= Aperture-to-medium coupling loss =

Concept in antenna theory

In telecommunications, aperture-to-medium coupling loss is the difference between the theoretical antenna gain of a very large antenna, such as the antennas in beyond-the-horizon microwave links, and the gain that can be realized in practice.

Note 1: Aperture-to-medium coupling loss is related to the ratio of the scatter angle to the antenna beamwidth.

Note 2: The "very large antennas" are referred to in wavelengths; thus, this loss can apply to line-of-sight systems as well.

== See also ==
- Coupling loss
