= Gimmick capacitor =

A gimmick capacitor is a capacitor made by twisting two pieces of insulated wire together. The capacitance may be varied by loosening or tightening the winding, making it a variable capacitor. The capacitance can also be reduced by shortening the twisted pair by cutting. The available capacitance is on the order of 1pF/inch (0.4 pF/cm).
