= Capacitive coupling =

Transfer of energy between circuits

Capacitive coupling is the transfer of energy within an electrical network or between distant networks by means of displacement current between circuit(s) nodes, induced by the electric field. This coupling can have an intentional or accidental effect.

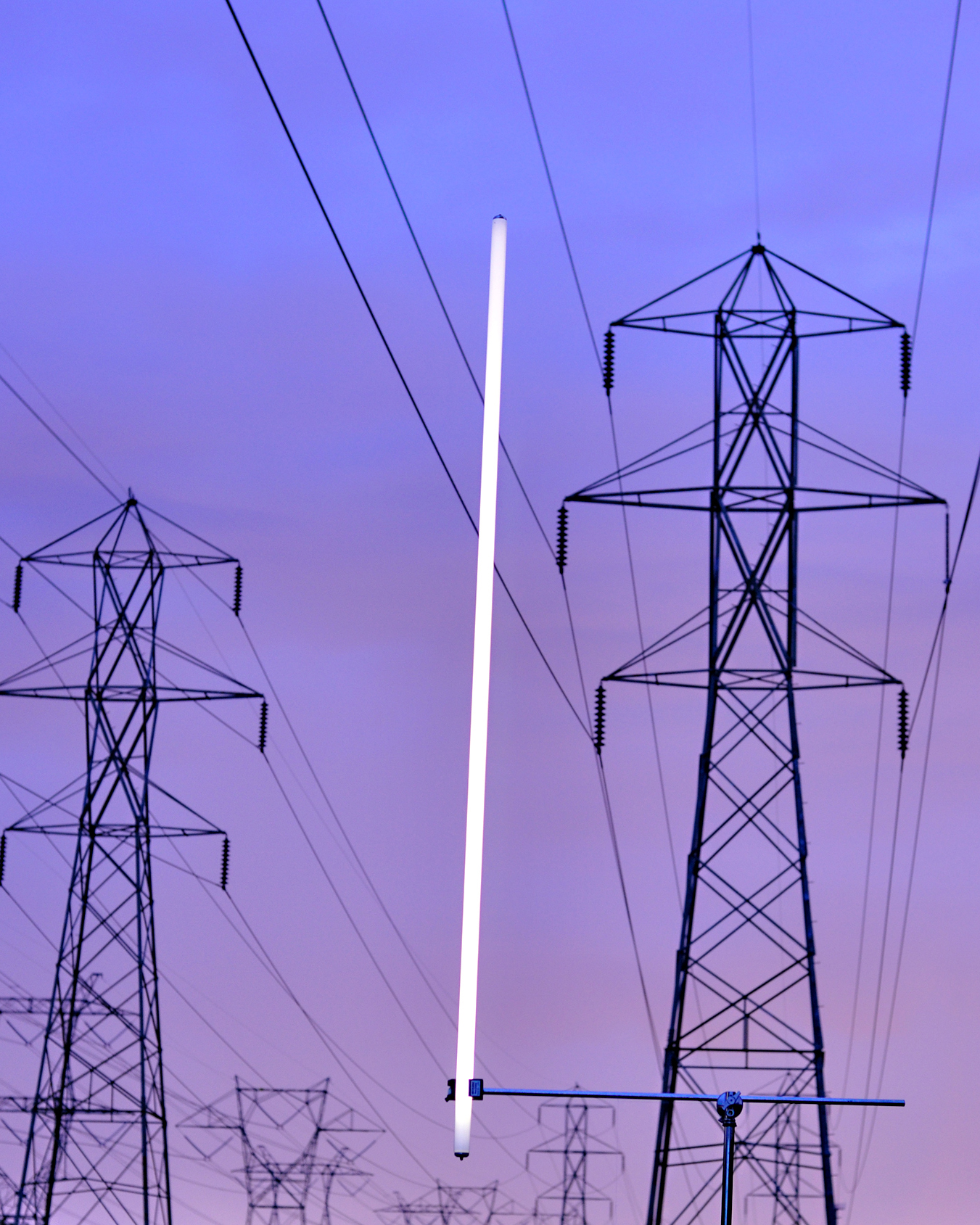
Capacitive coupling from high-voltage power lines can light a lamp continuously at low intensity.

In its simplest implementation, capacitive coupling is achieved by placing a capacitor between two nodes. Where analysis of many points in a circuit is carried out, the capacitance at each point and between points can be described in a matrix form.

== Use in analog circuits ==
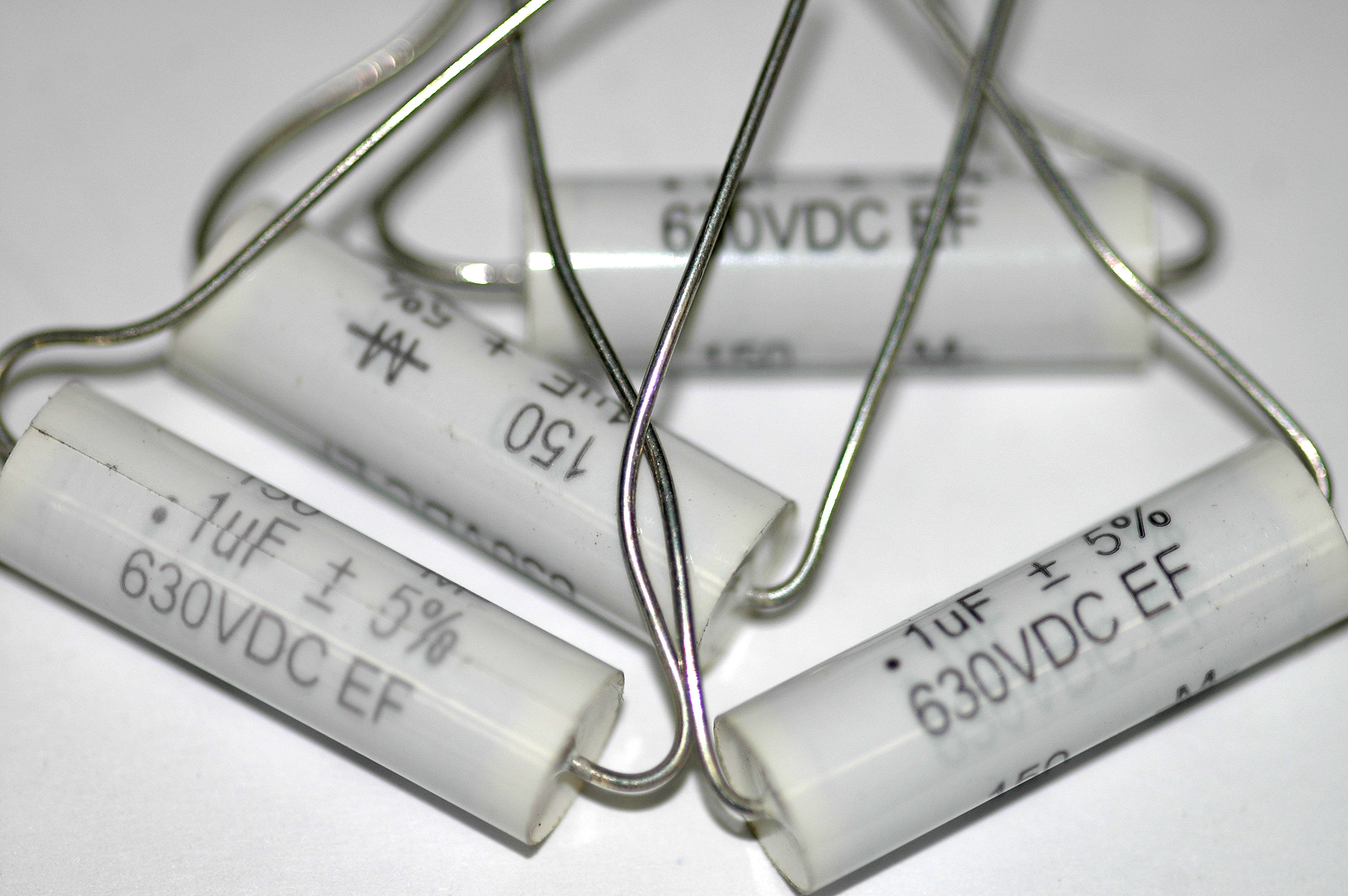
Polyester film capacitors, commonly used for coupling between two circuits.

In analog circuits, a coupling capacitor is used to connect two circuits such that only the AC signal from the first circuit can pass through to the next while DC is blocked. This technique helps to isolate the DC bias settings of the two coupled circuits. Capacitive coupling is also known as AC coupling and the capacitor used for the purpose is also known as a DC-blocking capacitor.

A coupling capacitor's ability to prevent a DC load from interfering with an AC source is particularly useful in Class A amplifier circuits by preventing a 0 volt input being passed to a transistor with additional resistor biasing; creating continuous amplification.

Capacitive coupling decreases the low frequency gain of a system containing capacitively coupled units. Each coupling capacitor along with the input electrical impedance of the next stage forms a high-pass filter and the sequence of filters results in a cumulative filter with a cutoff frequency that may be higher than those of each individual filter.

Coupling capacitors can also introduce nonlinear distortion at low frequencies. This is not an issue at high frequencies because the voltage across the capacitor stays very close to zero. However, if a signal passing through the coupling capacitance has a frequency that is low relative to the RC cutoff frequency, voltages can develop across the capacitor, which for some capacitor types results in changes of capacitance, leading to distortion. This is avoided by choosing capacitor types that have low voltage coefficient, and by using large values that put the cutoff frequency far lower than the frequencies of the signal.

== Use in digital circuits ==
AC coupling is also widely used in digital circuits to transmit digital signals with a zero DC component, known as DC-balanced signals. DC-balanced waveforms are useful in communications systems, since they can be used over AC-coupled electrical connections to avoid voltage imbalance problems and charge accumulation between connected systems or components.

For this reason, most modern line codes are designed to produce DC-balanced waveforms. The most common classes of DC-balanced line codes are constant-weight codes and paired-disparity codes.

== Gimmick loop ==
A gimmick loop is a simple type of capacitive coupler: two closely spaced strands of wire. It provides capacitive coupling of a few picofarads between two nodes. Usually the wires are twisted together.

== Parasitic capacitive coupling ==
Capacitive coupling is often unintended, such as the capacitance between two wires or PCB traces that are next to each other. One signal may capacitively couple with another and cause what appears to be noise. To reduce coupling, wires or traces are often separated as much as possible, or ground lines or ground planes are run in between signals that might affect each other, so that the lines capacitively couple to ground rather than each other. Prototypes of high-frequency (tens of megahertz) or high-gain analog circuits often use circuits that are built over a ground plane to control unwanted coupling. If a high-gain amplifier's output capacitively couples to its input it may become an electronic oscillator.

== See also ==
- Coupling (electronics)
- DC block
- Decoupling (electronics)
  - Decoupling capacitor
- Direct coupling
- Differential capacitance
- RC coupling
- Crosstalk
