= Abominable Firebug =

- Abominable Firebug
- Author: Richard B. Johnson
- Cover artist: William Siy Tin
- Language: English
- Subject: Juvenile corrections Juvenile delinquency Child abuse Child rape
- Genre: Memoir
- Publisher: iUniverse
- Publication date: May 11, 2006
- Publication place: United States
- Media type: Print (paperback)
- Pages: 172
- ISBN: 0-595-38667-9
- OCLC: 123232489

Abominable Firebug is a book about survival as one of America's throwaway children.

== Synopsis and style ==
This book is a chronology of the early life of the author, Richard B. Johnson, starting in the town of North Brookfield, Massachusetts. It begins at about the age of two and continues until Johnson is 21 years of age. The book details the significant events in the author's life leading to his incarceration in America's first reform school, the Lyman School for Boys in the late 1950s.

=== Explanation of the title ===
When the author lived in an institutional foster home, the Stetson Home for Boys, in Barre, Massachusetts, as an indentured servant, he built a relatively large solid-fuel rocket. The last flight of this rocket resulted in the institution's barn being set on fire. The author was charged as a juvenile with the crime of arson and then remanded to the custody of the Massachusetts Youth Service Board and sent to the Roslindale detention center. Thereupon, he was called a firebug by the juvenile authorities.

=== Governmental abuse of children under its care ===
In particular, the book details the physical, emotional, and sexual abuse meted out by agents of the Commonwealth of Massachusetts Youth Service Board (YSB), later becoming the Department of Youth Services (DYS). Johnson provides descriptions of the abuse he and other boys received but stops short of any prurient references. Although this book has much to do about child abuse, the main theme is one of survival. Johnson was able to find some mentors who helped him become a successful adult and he names them and gives the details in his book.

=== Significance ===
The book is significant because it details the day-to-day life of inmates in America's first reform school, the Lyman School for Boys. Written from the perspective of a resident who, because of earlier experiences, thought that this school was a good place to live, it provides a unique view into the problems and solutions facing the juvenile correctional facilities at the time. The book also details some of the many problems encountered by children growing up in institutional settings such as institutional foster homes. For instance, there is a particularly poignant story about a Boston police officer beating Johnson when he was discovered playing a church pipe organ that he had recently repaired. The management of the foster home could not do anything about that because such police activity was considered “normal,” so Johnson should have avoided the police.

=== Mentoring ===
This book demonstrates the value of mentors in a child's life. Even as Johnson was approaching adulthood, he found people who had the faith to trust him with activities of significant consequence. For instance, at the age of eighteen Johnson's boss at a radio station let him build a new radio transmitter. Another mentor in Boston taught him to repair a pipe organ and trusted him to do the right thing.

=== Resilience of youth ===
Throughout the book is continual evidence of the resilience of youth. As Johnson would encounter some problem and fail, he would immediately do something else and succeed. The book demonstrates the idea that there should never be a “lost cause” when dealing with youth. In the worst possible circumstances, it is certainly possible to succeed.

== Techniques ==
The book heads each chapter with a photograph and contains several poems that Johnson wrote as a child while enduring his captivity. At several metaphorical intervals, Johnson writes prose that reads like poetry. Dr. Mary Clisbee, established educator of special needs children, writes the foreword and Rev. F. Robert Brown, Johnson's chaplain while at the Lyman School, writes the afterword. Rev. "Bob" Brown later worked for the newly formed DYS helping correct its horrific past.

== Reviews ==
- Book review from EdNews
