= North Brookfield, Massachusetts =

- Town
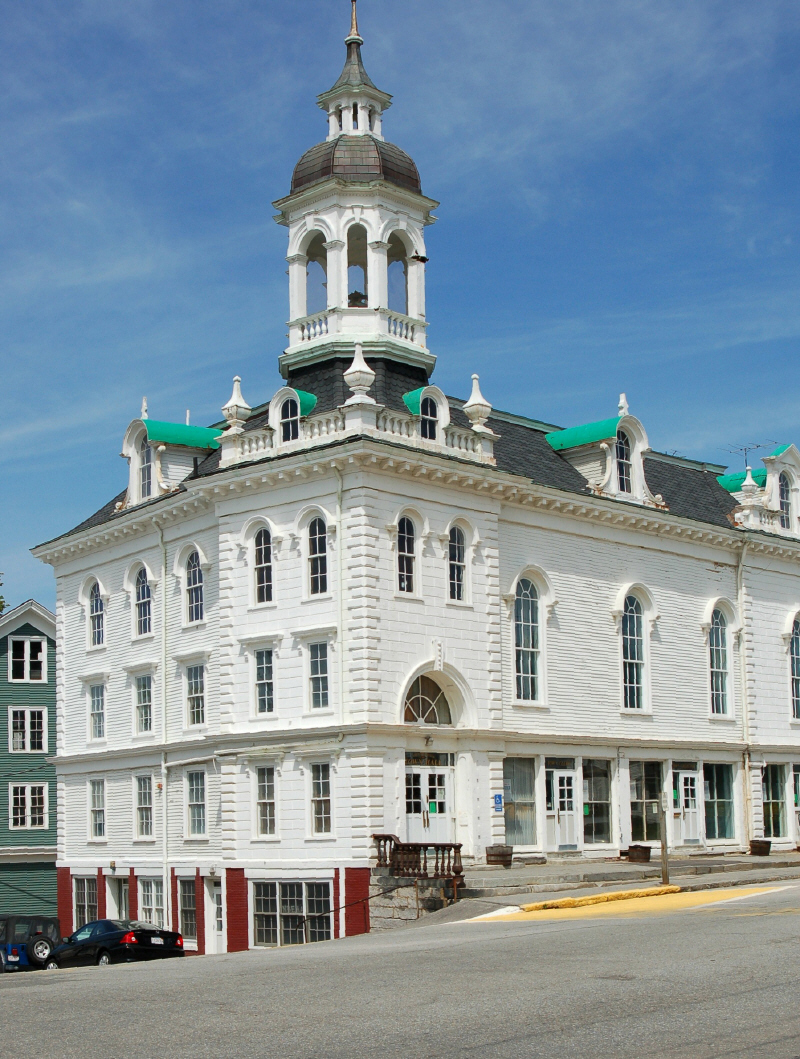
- North Brookfield Town Hall

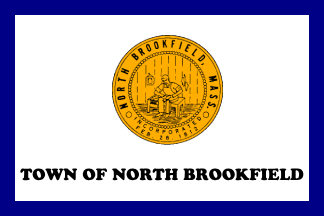
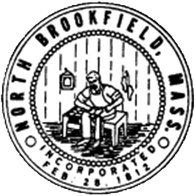
- Flag Seal
- Nickname: NB
- Location in Worcester County and the state of Massachusetts.
- Coordinates: 42°16′00″N 72°05′00″W
- Country: United States
- State: Massachusetts
- County: Worcester
- Settled: 1664
- Incorporated: 1812

Government
  - Type: Open town meeting
  - Administrative Assistant: Leslie Scott Burton
  - Board of Selectmen: Dale Kiley, Jason Petraitis, John Tripp

Area
  - Total: 21.7 sq mi (56.3 km^{2})
  - Land: 21.0 sq mi (54.5 km^{2})
  - Water: 0.66 sq mi (1.7 km^{2})
- Elevation: 915 ft (279 m)

Population (2020)
  - Total: 4,735
  - Density: 225/sq mi (86.9/km^{2})
- Time zone: UTC−5 (Eastern)
  - Summer (DST): UTC−4 (Eastern)
- ZIP Code: 01535
- Area code: 508/774
- FIPS code: 25-47135
- GNIS feature ID: 0618377
- Website: northbrookfield.net

North Brookfield is a town in Worcester County, Massachusetts, United States. The population was 4,735 at the 2020 census. The town includes the census-designated place of North Brookfield (CDP).

== History ==
North Brookfield was first settled in 1664 and was officially incorporated in 1812, splitting from neighboring Brookfield.

The town's lands were formerly a part of the Quaboag Plantation.

== Geography ==
According to the United States Census Bureau, the town has a total area of 21.7 square miles (56 km^{2}), of which 21.1 square miles (55 km^{2}) are land and 0.7 square miles (1.8 km^{2}), or 3.04%, is water. North Brookfield is bounded on the east by Spencer, on the south by East Brookfield and Brookfield, on the west by West Brookfield, and on the north by New Braintree. The junction of North Brookfield, Spencer and New Braintree is also shared by the town of Oakham; however, Brooks Pond cuts that point, as well as two others, off from the rest of the town.

== Demographics ==
Historical population
| Year | Pop. | ±% |
|---|---|---|
| 1850 | 1,939 | — |
| 1860 | 2,760 | +42.3% |
| 1870 | 3,343 | +21.1% |
| 1880 | 4,459 | +33.4% |
| 1890 | 3,871 | −13.2% |
| 1900 | 4,587 | +18.5% |
| 1910 | 3,075 | −33.0% |
| 1920 | 2,610 | −15.1% |
| 1930 | 3,013 | +15.4% |
| 1940 | 3,304 | +9.7% |
| 1950 | 3,444 | +4.2% |
| 1960 | 3,616 | +5.0% |
| 1970 | 3,967 | +9.7% |
| 1980 | 4,150 | +4.6% |
| 1990 | 4,683 | +12.8% |
| 2000 | 4,708 | +0.5% |
| 2010 | 4,680 | −0.6% |
| 2020 | 4,735 | +1.2% |
| 2022* | 4,728 | −0.1% |
* = population estimate. Source: United States census records and Population Estimates Program data.

As of the census of 2000, there were 4,683 people, 1,811 households, and 1,235 families residing in the town. The population density was 222.3 inhabitants per square mile (85.8/km^{2}). There were 1,902 housing units at an average density of 90.3 per square mile (34.9/km^{2}). The racial makeup of the town was 97.65% White, 0.34% Black or African American, 0.26% Native American, 0.21% Asian, 0.36% from other races, and 1.17% from two or more races. Hispanic or Latino of any race were 1.09% of the population.

There were 1,811 households, of which 33.3% had children under the age of 18 living with them, 53.5% were married couples living together, 10.8% had a female householder with no husband present, and 31.8% were non-families. Of all households, 25.8% were made up of individuals, and 11.4% had someone living alone who was 65 years of age or older. The average household size was 2.55 and the average family size was 3.09.

In the town, the population was spread out, with 27.2% under the age of 18, 7.0% from 18 to 24, 29.4% from 25 to 44, 23.4% from 45 to 64, and 12.9% who were 65 years of age or older. The median age was 37 years. For every 100 females, there were 96.4 males. For every 100 females age 18 and over, there were 92.9 males.

The median income for a household in the town was $44,286, and the median income for a family was $51,750. Males had a median income of $37,647 versus $30,324 for females. The per capita income for the town was $20,205. About 4.1% of families and 5.5% of the population were below the poverty line, including 7.8% of those under age 18 and 5.0% of those age 65 or over.

== Government ==
State government
| State Representative(s): | Donnie Berthiaume (R) |
| State Senator(s): | Peter J. Durant (R) |
| Governor's Councilor(s): | Paul M. DePalo (D) |
Federal government
| U.S. Representative(s): | James P. McGovern (D-2nd District), |
| U.S. Senators: | Elizabeth Warren (D), Ed Markey (D) |

== Library ==
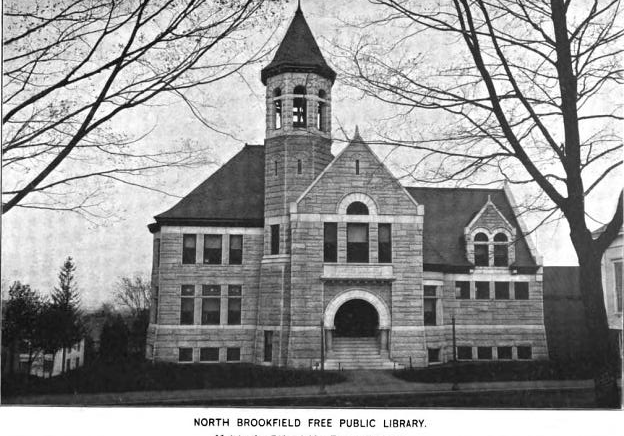
North Brookfield Public Library, 1899

The North Brookfield public library was established in 1879. In fiscal year 2008, the town of North Brookfield spent 0.84% ($92,958) of its budget on its public library—approximately $19 per person, per year ($23.27 adjusted for inflation in 2021).

== Education ==
There are two public schools in North Brookfield, North Brookfield Elementary School, serving grades K–6, and North Brookfield Junior-Senior High School. The school system is one of the smallest in the region, as almost all nearby towns of similar size joined regional districts.

The private Valley View School and Mad Brook Academy are also located in North Brookfield.

== Points of interest ==
- Town Hall
- First Congregational Church of North Brookfield
- Long View Farm recording studios
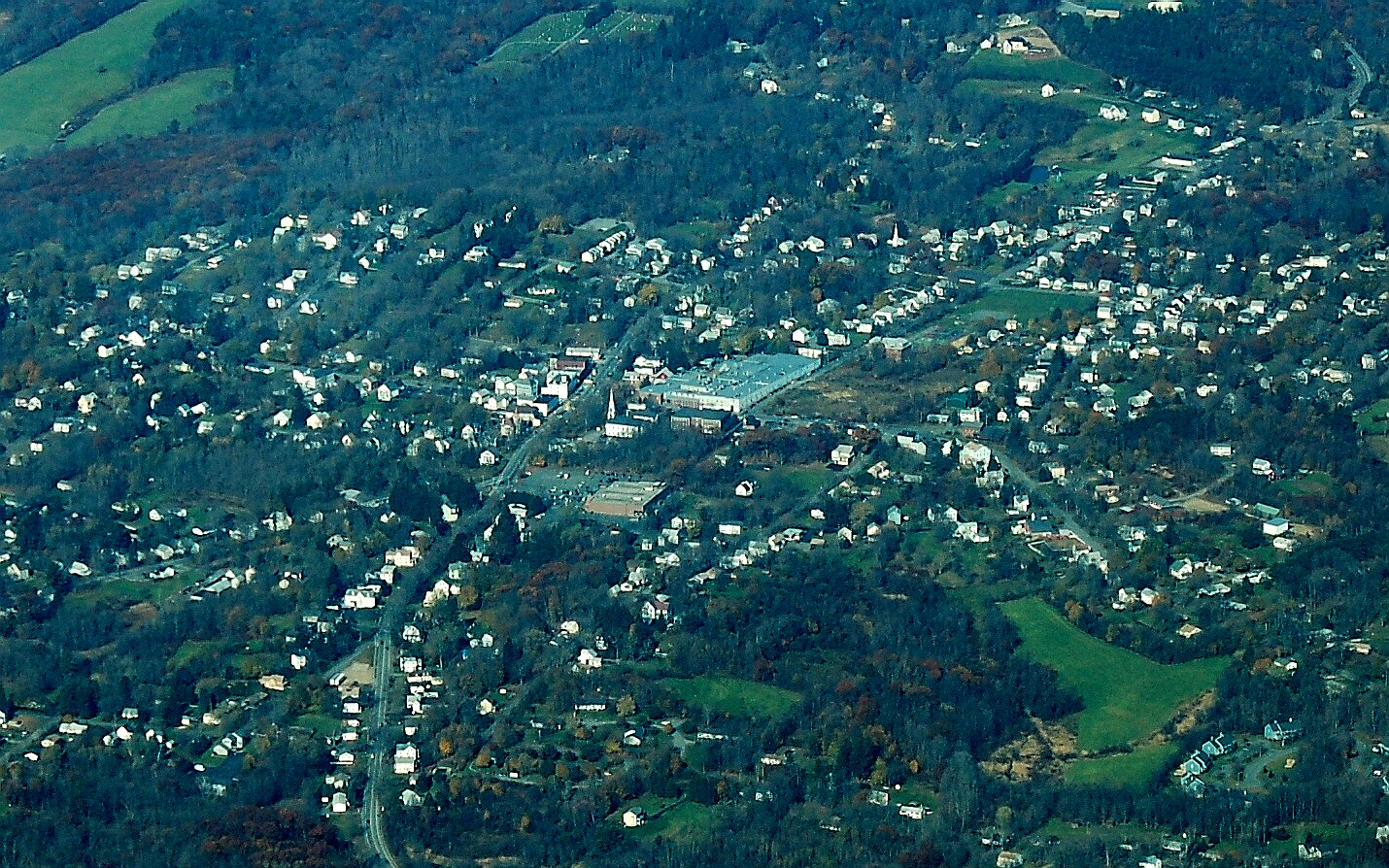
North Brookfield looking north

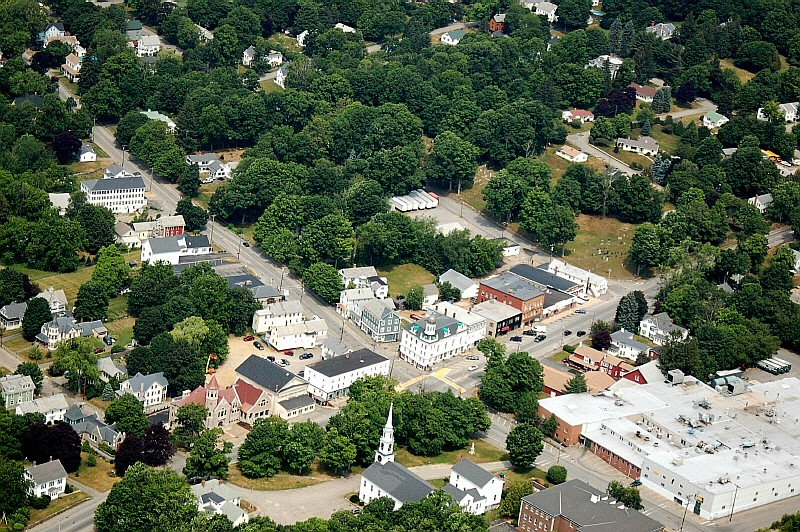
North Brookfield center

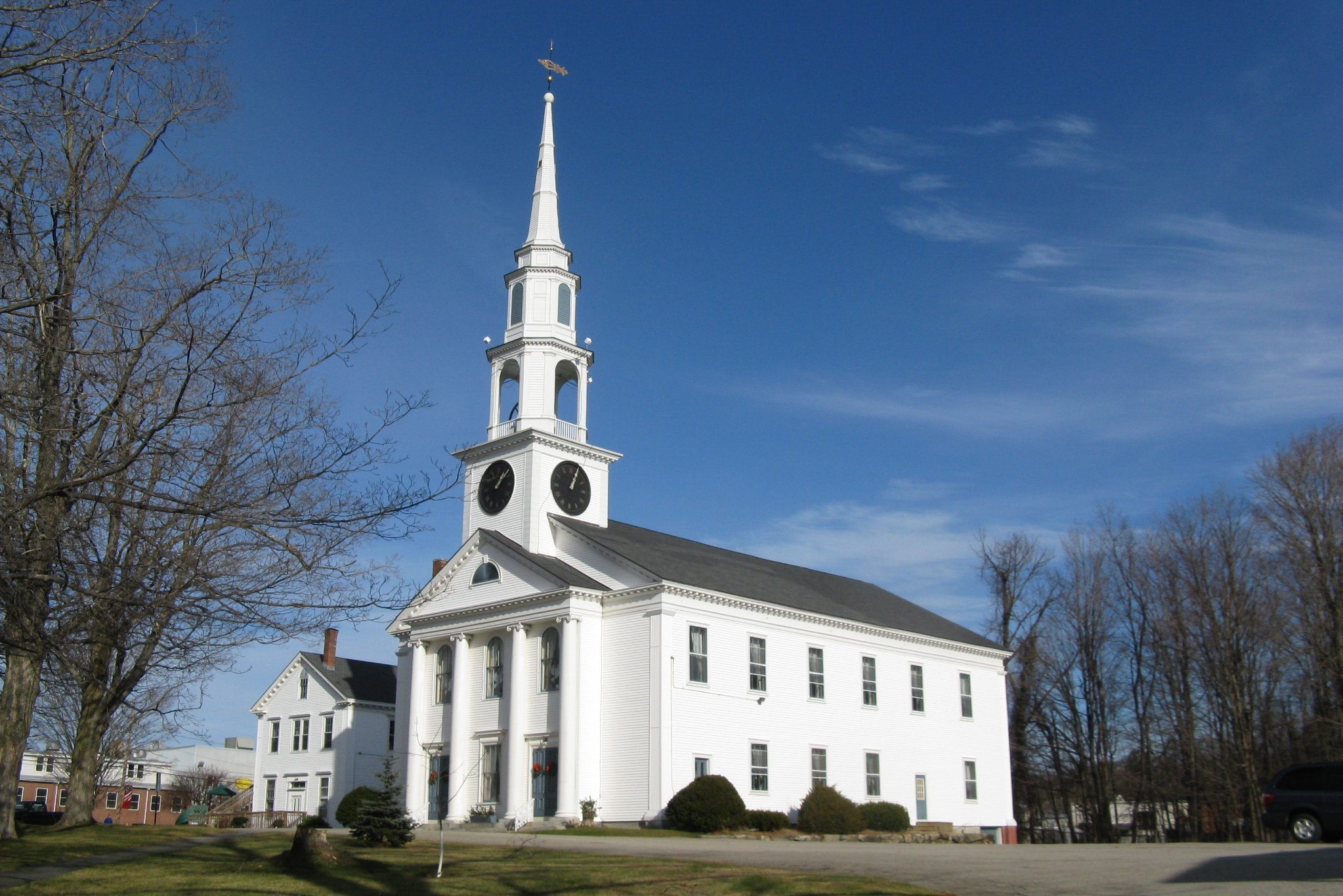
First Congregational Church

== Notable people ==
- Tryphosa Bates-Batcheller (1876–1952), writer, socialite and singer
- Bill Bergen, National League baseball player with the Cincinnati Reds and the Brooklyn Dodgers, younger brother of Marty Bergen
- Marty Bergen, Boston Beaneaters player, triple murderer
- William Cullen Bryant poet, journalist and editor of the New York Evening Post
- George M. Cohan, entertainer, playwright, composer, lyricist, actor, singer, dancer, director
- Frank Cooke, optics designer and manufacturer
- "Big" Al Downing, country and rockabilly musician
- William Cary Duncan (1874–1945), playwright and author
- Abbie M. Gannett (1845–1895), essayist, poet and philanthropist
- Robert B. Groat (1888–1959), Printer, publisher, and politician
- Richard B. Johnson, author of Abominable Firebug (ISBN 0-595-38667-9) which details his childhood in North Brookfield, attending the "Yellow School" across from the "Asbestos Shop." Later he writes about the Lyman School for Boys, the reform school he attended
- Amasa Walker, Economist, United States Representative and father of Francis Amasa Walker
- Francis Amasa Walker, economist, statistician, journalist, educator, president of MIT, and military officer in the Union Army
