= Batcheller =

Batcheller may refer to:

- Tryphosa Bates-Batcheller, American socialite
- George Sherman Batcheller, American soldier, politician, diplomat and jurist

== See also ==
- Bachelor
- David Batcheller Mellish, United States Representative from New York
- James Batcheller Sumner, American chemist
- Doris Batcheller Humphrey, American dancer
