= Abbie M. Gannett =

American essayist, poet, philanthropist (1845–1895)

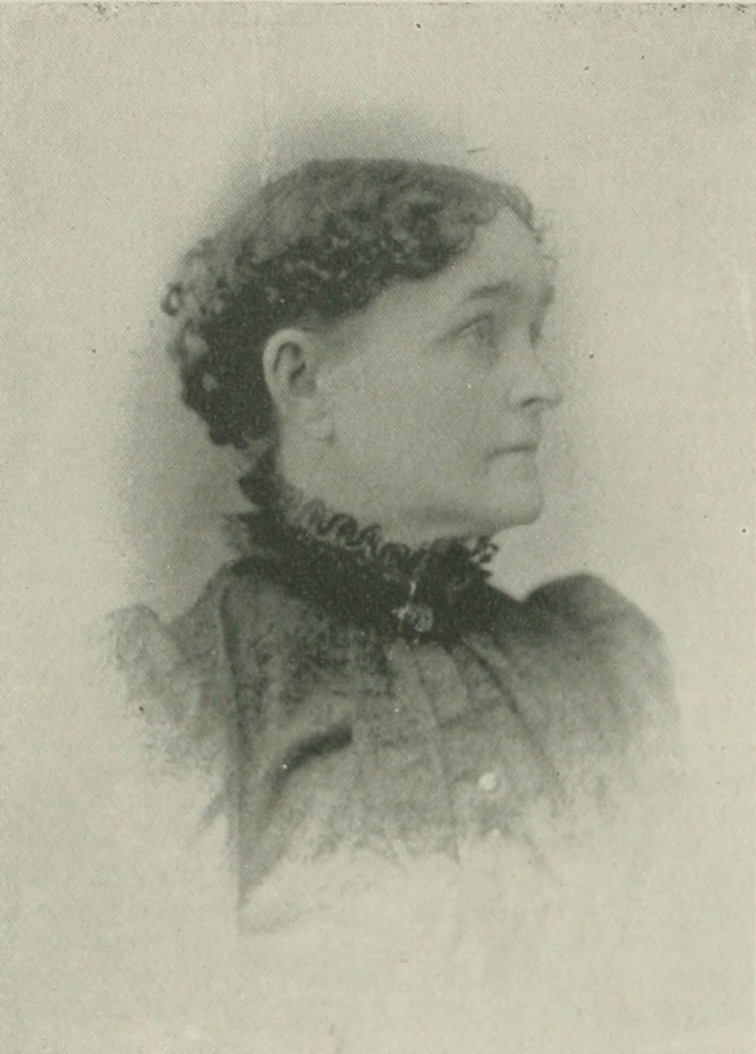
Abbie M. Gannett, "A Woman of the Century"

Abbie M. Gannett (July 8, 1845 – March 22, 1895) was an essayist, poet and philanthropist, author of the poem "Tis Love That Makes the World Go Round".

== Early life ==
Abbie M. Gannett was born in North Brookfield, Massachusetts, on July 8, 1845. Her girlhood was passed in that town. Her love for the countryside and her early associations are reflected in her volume of poems, The Old Farm Home (Boston, 1888).

== Career ==
Gannett taught school for a few years in Massachusetts, Michigan, and St. Louis, Missouri.

She was well known in the women's clubs as a reader of thoughtful essays on current themes. She tilled the Unitarian pulpit on a few occasions and served on the Maiden school board. Her essays, poems, sketches and stories had a wide publication, many of them appearing in the leading magazines and periodicals.

She was deeply interested in the welfare of women and their higher education. Her paper on The Intellectuality of Women, printed in the International Review, excited wide comment.

She espoused the cause of the neglected Anna Ella Carroll with enthusiasm. By a series of articles in the Boston Transcript and other papers she did as much as any one woman to bring her case to public notice. She joined the Woman's Relief Corps and attended the Grand Army of the Republic encampment in Minneapolis to advocate that lady's cause. She won recognition for her and was appointed chairman of a national relief committee to raise funds for Carroll. The effort was successful. Not content with that, Gannett visited Washington and argued Carroll's case before the military committees of both Senate and House.

== Personal life ==
Abbie M. Gannett became the wife of Captain Wyllys Gannett, a nephew of the Unitarian clergyman of Boston, and himself a writer of sketches of travel and sea stories. Captain Gannett served through the Civil War in the 24th Massachusetts and the 55th Massachusetts Infantry Regiment. After living a few years in St. Louis, the Gannetts went to Boston, where they made their home for a short time. For many years they lived in Malden, Massachusetts. They had three children.

She died on March 22, 1895, in Malden.
