= North Brookfield High School =

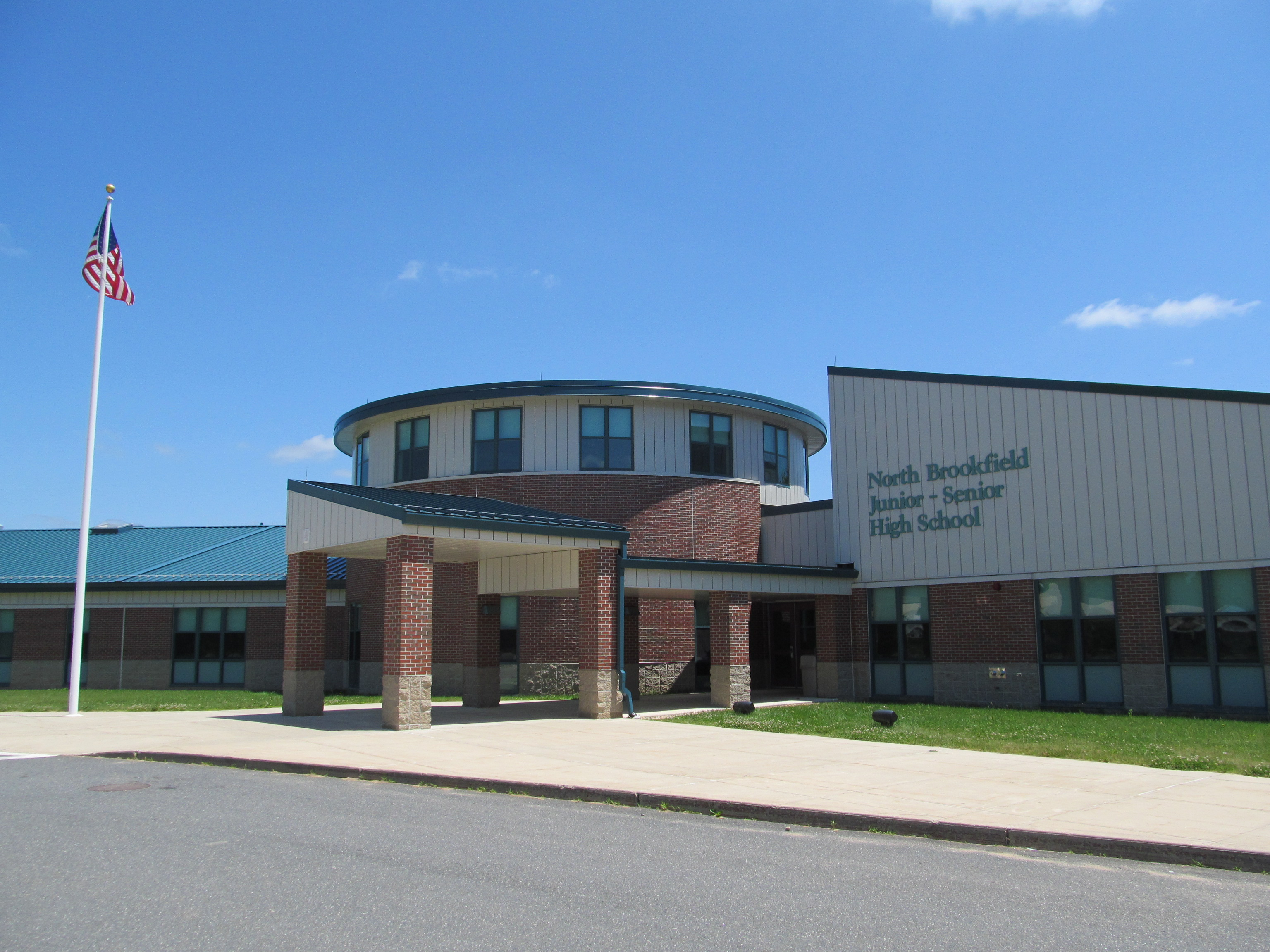

Location
- 10 New School Dr; North Brookfield, Massachusetts 01535; United States; 42°16′38.04″N 72°4′42.52″W

Information
- Type: Public; Open enrollment
- Established: 1857
- Principal: John Diorio
- Faculty: 28.60 (FTE)
- Grades: 7–12
- Enrollment: 157 (2024–2025)
- Student to teacher ratio: 5.49
- Campus type: Rural, residential
- Colors: Purple & White
- Mascot: Indian
- Website: nbschools.org

North Brookfield High School is a public high school in North Brookfield, Massachusetts, United States. The school serves the residents of North Brookfield exclusively, making it one of the smallest high schools in the region. Recently, a new building was built next to the old one. The construction was completed in 2006. NBHS was founded in 1857, making 2007 its 150th anniversary.

== Campus and location ==
North Brookfield High School is located at 10 New School Drive, in the town of North Brookfield, Massachusetts. It is close to Route 67 and Route 148.

The campus is also home to North Brookfield Elementary School, North Brookfield Junior High School, and the superintendent's office. The NBHS campus features several fields for baseball, softball, soccer, and field hockey, as well as a children's playground and a spacious parking lot.

== Administration ==
The current superintendent of North Brookfield schools is Tim McCormick. Brian Beck serves as principal of the high school.

== Academics ==
NBHS maintains three different levels for academic courses: College Preparatory, Honors Courses, and Advanced Placement courses.

In order to graduate, students must have completed 120 credits and the English and Mathematics portions of the MCAS exams. The 120-credit requirement breaks down as follows: 20 credits English, 5 credits US History, 10 credits Social Studies Electives, 15 credits Mathematics, 15 credits, Science, 4 credits Physical Education, 2 credits Computer Science, and 2 credits Health. NBHS also offers courses in art and band.

All students are to complete a minimum of 40 hours of community service prior to graduation. The community service is expected to be completed during all four of their high school years. A minimum of 7 hours are to be completed during the junior year and any remaining hours are to be completed during the senior year.

== Athletics ==
NBHS offers varsity in soccer, basketball, baseball, softball and field hockey per MIAA rules. In 2023 North Brookfield did not have enough students to participate in spring varsity baseball or fall varsity soccer programs.

=== Mascot controversy ===
In 2020 the school board voted to change the team name and mascot. Less than a year later a new board voted to rescind that decision, keeping the mascot. The original decision was made in response to testimony by members of local tribes that the use of "Indian" names and images was hurtful and culturally inappropriate.
