= Stetson School =

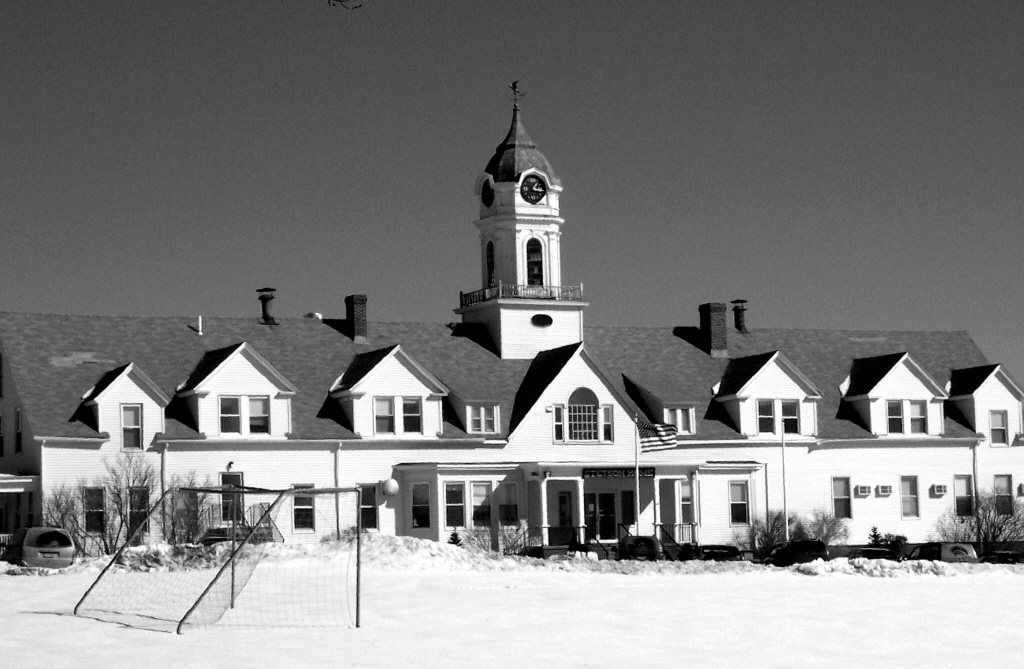
- Stetson Home for Boys

Location
- Barre, Massachusetts; United States; 42°24′36″N 72°06′27″W

Information
- Former name: Stetson Home for Boys
- Type: Private residential
- Established: 1899
- Founder: Henry Augustus Pevear
- CEEB code: 220107
- Director: Joseph Allred
- Principal: Carrie Lehmann
- Staff: 320
- Faculty: 100
- Gender: Boys
- Age range: 9 to 21
- Enrollment: 120
- Campus size: 200 acres (0.81 km^{2})
- Campus type: Rural
- Colors: Yellow and Green
- Mascot: Bumble Bee
- Website: www.stetsonschool.org

The Stetson School is a private residential institution located in Barre, Massachusetts.

== History ==
Founded in 1899, by Henry Augustus Pevear, and then known as the Stetson Home for Boys began as an orphanage. It supported itself as a commercial dairy farm wherein each of its capable residents worked to help support the institution. During its early history, this institution maintained a primary school for training its residents. Secondary schooling was not required in the Commonwealth of Massachusetts at the time of its founding. Once Massachusetts required school attendance up to sixteen years of age, residents requiring secondary education attended the Barre, Massachusetts High School. Notwithstanding its lack of educational facilities at the time, i.e., classes only to the 8th grade, the Stetson Home for Boys became known as the Stetson School, which continues today.

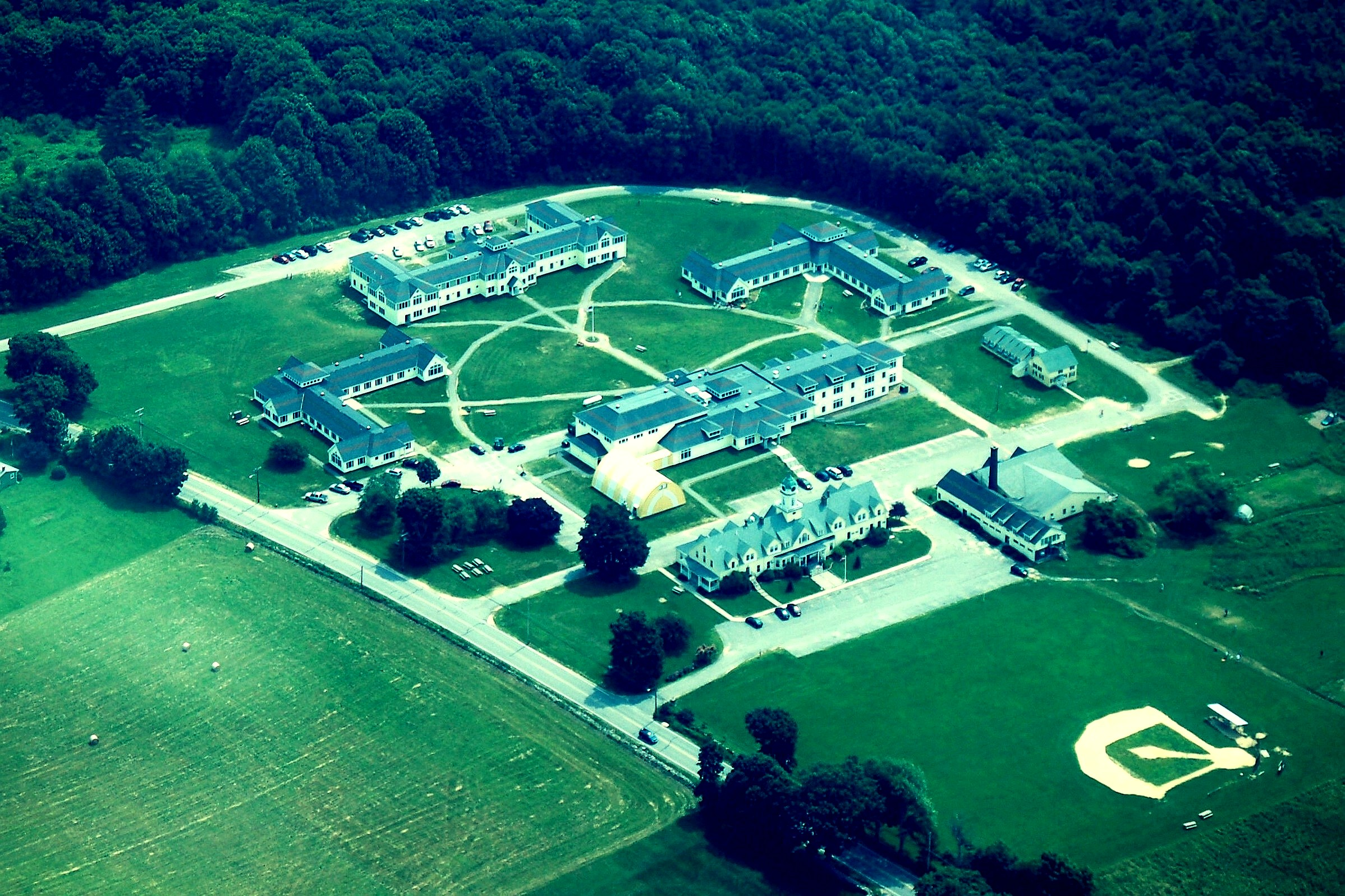
Stetson Home from the air

By the 1960s, Stetson began treatment for emotionally disturbed boys, often from broken homes, who had suffered some form of abuse or neglect. Later, Massachusetts General Laws (MCG) Chapter 766 legislation passed, and Stetson started a program approved by the Massachusetts Board of Education. At that time, its educational levels extended to the 12th grade so the resident’s attendance in an external school was no longer required.

In 1990, Stetson began to admit juvenile males with a history of sexually abusive behaviors, which continues to this day. By 1994, Stetson specialized in treating male children with sexual behavior problems.

In the early 2000s, Stetson began to lose financial and clinical ground given the cost and length of average stay. Although Stetson demonstrated a recidivism rate of only 2.7%, a study was released by UNH demonstrating the futility of rehabilitating sexually abusive teenagers. Placements declined when funding was reduced around 2007 which had a material impact on Stetson’s finances.

In March 2013 Stetson School became an affiliate of the Seven Hills Foundation of Worcester, Mass. The school has since undergone a welcomed change in managerial staff and overcome many of its past problems. They have since shifted their custodial model from providing care for male children with sexual behavior problems to attachment-oriented, trauma-informed, and developmentally sensitive treatment.

== Notable alumni ==
- Philip J. Lampi, Academic
- Richard B. Johnson, Burnt down the school’s barn, later became a published author and successful engineer.
