= Tryphosa Bates-Batcheller =

American singer (1876–1952)

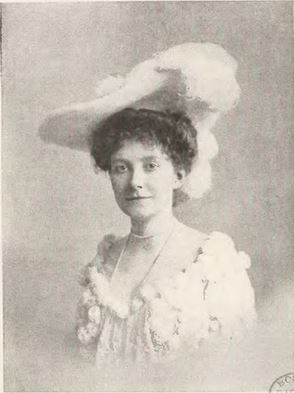

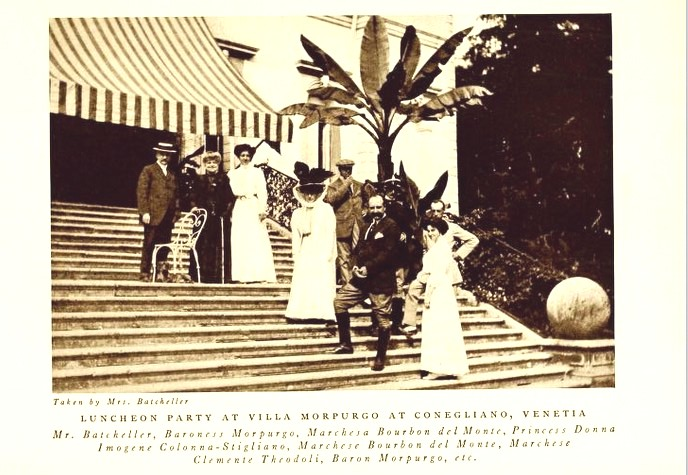
Luncheon party at Villa Morpurgo at Conegliano, Venetia (l.t.r. Tryphoa Bates-Batcheller, Baroness Morpugo, Marchesa Bourbon del Monte, Princess Donna Imogene Colonna Stiglioano, Marchese Bourben del Monte, Marchese Clementi Thendoli, Baron Morpurgo (photograph taken by Mrs. Bates-Batcheller)

Tryphosa Bates-Batcheller (April 14, 1876–1952), born Tryphosa Duncan Bates, was an American socialite, club woman and concert singer. She is often mentioned in the same context as Florence Foster Jenkins: both are apt to be criticised as people who were publicly tolerated and even celebrated as singers due to their wealth and social position, despite a lack of talent.

== Background and education ==
Tryphosa Duncan Bates was born the only child of Theodore Cornelius and Emma Frances (Duncan) Bates. Her father was a manufacturer, proprietor, and a Republican politician of English ancestry. She was named after her maternal grandmother, Tryphosa (Larkin) Duncan. She came from a family of some means and pedigree, and was privately educated in France and the United States, graduating from Radcliffe College in 1899. According to the Biographical Cyclopedia of U.S. Women, her family was prominent in the Boston area, and her ancestor Joshua Bates gave $50,000 in 1853 and later 30,000 volumes to the city of Boston toward the establishment of the Boston Public Library. Apparently the idea of the modern library, where books could be taken from shelves by readers and then returned, was his, and the Boston Library was the first in the world to do this; its main reading room is called Bates Hall.

== Musical career ==
Tryphosa believed she had a good singing voice and was encouraged by friends and relatives, eventually studying classical singing with several famous teachers, including Giovanni Sgambati, Blanche and Mathilde Marchesi, Sir George Henschel, B. T. Lang, as well as Veda, Bimboni, and Giraudet. In 1904 she married the wealthy shoe manufacturer Francis B. Batcheller and thereafter retained her maiden name as the first half of her hyphenated married name. The couple left their native North Brookfield, Massachusetts home and set up home in an apartment in Paris, France.

Her wealth and social position seems to have papered over any doubts teachers, managers and critics had about the dismal quality of her actual singing, and she appeared in many private concerts and benefits, sometimes with the composer Jules Massenet accompanying her. Her wealth enabled her to appear on the cover of America's Musical Courier magazine twice, in 1904 and 1906. A relentless social climber who chased after aristocrats and royalty, Bates-Batcheller was hampered in this by her own Catholicism, and was thus prevented from assaulting the important Protestant court of England. Her aggressive pursuits in this area are chronicled in the four books of memoirs and one novel she had published.

In 1941, she returned to the United States and, shortly after, recorded two sides for the same vanity record label (Melotone) in New York as Jenkins. These recordings lay unnoticed in the collection of the musicologist and record collector Larry Holdridge until they were published in 2004 on a compact disc entitled "The Muse Surmounted" (Homophone 1001), the booklet for which contains a biography of Bates-Batcheller, as well as recordings and information about Jenkins and others of the same style, along with photos of each and other information. The recording presents a compilation of the history of this kind of singing on record, and the writer, musicologist Gregor Benko, states his opinion that Bates-Batcheller was an even "greater" bad singer than Florence Foster Jenkins. A review of this compilation stated that "Bates-Batcheller's contribution to music ranks with William McGonagall's to poetry". Tryphosa mentioned in one of her books that she also recorded a Schubert song, but this has not, alas, been located.

== Works ==
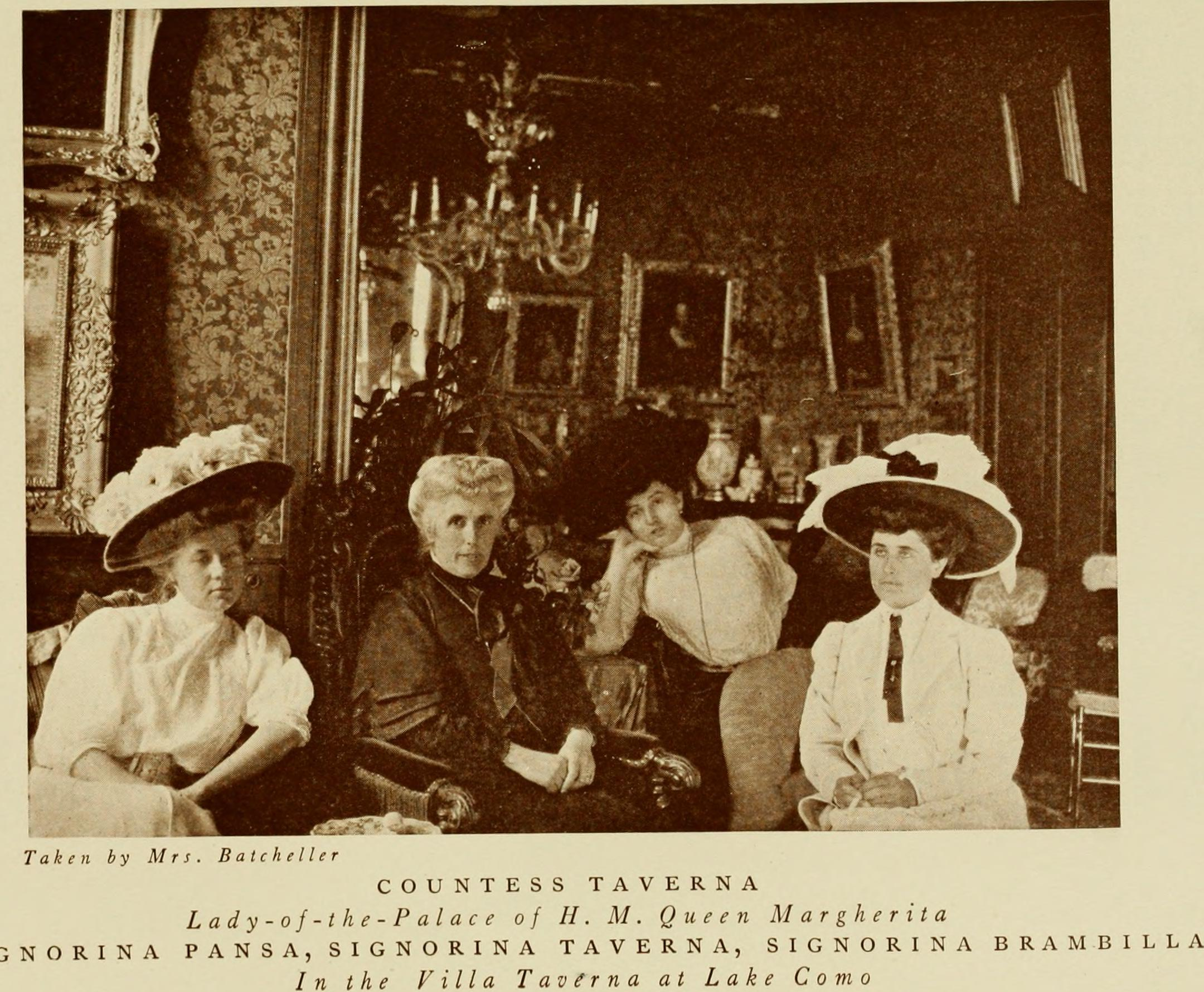
Photo taken by Tryphosa Bates-Batcheller (Italian Castles and Country Seats)

- Glimpses of Italian court life; happy days in Italia adorata, Doubleday, Page & company, New York 1906.
- Italian Castles and Country Seats, Longmans, Green & Co., New York 1911.
- Royal Spain of today, Longmans, Green & Co., New York 1913.
- The Soul of a Queen, Brentano's, New York 1943.
- France in sunshine and shadow, Brentano's, New York 1944.
