= Richard B. Johnson =

American computer scientist

Richard Brian Johnson is the author of the book Abominable Firebug (ISBN 0-595-38667-9), which presents his account of daily life at the Lyman School for Boys. Johnson invented the Rubber Ducky antenna while attending the Lyman School for Boys. Johnson went on to a career as an engineer and inventor. He also created the JMODEM file transfer protocol. Johnson founded the Danvers, Massachusetts, software company, Route 495 Software, LLC, in early 2009. Johnson is also an activist for civil rights issues, and has communicated with the President of the United States on issues involving general aviation. Johnson has continued to give talks to groups interested in learning about the nation's first reform school.

== Bibliography ==
- Johnson, Richard B. (2006). Abominable Firebug: a Memoir. Lincoln: iUniverse.
