= Through-the-earth communications =

Radio signalling used in mines and caves

Through-the-Earth (TTE) signalling is a type of radio signalling used in mines and caves that uses low-frequency waves to penetrate dirt and rock, which are opaque to higher-frequency conventional radio signals.

In mining, these lower-frequency signals can be relayed underground through various antennas, repeater or mesh configurations, but communication is restricted to line of sight to these antenna and repeater systems.

== Overview ==
Radio communication within caves is problematic because rock is a conductor and therefore absorbs radio waves. Ordinary radios typically have a very short range within caves. Low frequency (LF) or very low frequency (VLF) radio with single-sideband modulation is more commonly used today.

Through-the-Earth transmission can overcome these restrictions by using ultra-low frequency (300–3000 Hz) signals, which can travel through several hundred feet of rock strata. The antenna cable can be located on the surface only at a mine site, and provide signal coverage to the mine. The antenna may be placed in a "loop" formation around the perimeter of the mine site (or wherever coverage is needed) for systems using magnetic fields to carry signals. Systems that use electric fields as the signal carrier are not subject to this limitation. Transmissions propagate through rock strata which is used as the medium to carry the ultra-low-frequency signals. This is important in mining applications, particularly after any significant incident, such as fire or explosion, which would destroy much of the fixed communication infrastructure underground.

If the terrain makes a loop surface antenna impractical to install, then the antenna can be installed underground or a non-magnetic field type carrier may be used. But because the signal travels through rock, the antenna does not need to run into all parts of the mine to achieve mine wide signal coverage, thus minimizing the risk of damage during an incident.

== Cave radios ==
Portable magnetic-loop cave radios have been used by cavers for two-way communication and cave surveying since the 1960s. In a typical setup the transmitting loop, consisting of many turns of copper wire, is oriented horizontally within the cave using a spirit level, and driven at a few kHz. Though such a small antenna is a very poor radiator of propagating radio waves at this low frequency, its local AC magnetic field is strong enough to be detected by a similar receiving antenna up to a few hundred meters (yards) away. The received signal's strength and its dependence on orientation of the receiving coil yields approximate distance and directional information.

Early models were called "speleophones"—for instance Bob Mackin's "Molefone". The Molefone is called "one of the first practical cave radios", though it is no longer manufactured. Other popular LF/VLF radios include the HeyPhone, Nicola System and Cave-Link. HeyPhone and Nicola operate single (upper) sideband on 87 kHz in the LF band, while Cave-Link uses different frequencies between 20–140 kHz depending on the expected distance at 30 W power.

Systems like Molefone and HeyPhone operate as single-sideband (USB) 87 kHz radio with earthed electrodes of 25–100 metres (80 to 330 feet) length. Design for HeyPhone system is openly available. European Cave Rescue Association (ECRA) maintains a list of systems scalable and reliable enough to be used for cave rescue operations. As of April 2023 the catalogue lists CaveLink (Switzerland), Nicola (Great Britain), μHeyPhone (Great Britain) and Pimprenelle (France) as operational wireless systems.

== Personal emergency device ==
There are several systems that have been recently developed. One system is known as the PED System, where PED is an acronym for personal emergency device. Initially developed after a mining disaster in Australia at Moura No. 4 Coal Mine in 1986, and further developed after the Moura No. 2 Coal Mine explosion in 1994 where the need for a communication system to survive major incidents underground was identified in the inquiries into the disasters.

PED is a one-way text paging device, with wide use in Australia, as well as installations in the United States, China, Canada, Mongolia, Chile, Tanzania, and Sweden. Australian company MST Global (formerly Mine Site Technologies) began the development of PED in 1987, and it became commercially available and Mine Safety & Health Administration (MSHA) approved in 1991. The best documented use of PED during a mine emergency is from the Willow Creek Mine Fire in 1998 in Utah, where it was able to quickly alert miners underground of the need to evacuate before toxic fumes from the fire filled the mine. Reports of this use can be seen on the MSHA website.

== Development ==
Emerging technologies have recently been developed such as the Rescue Dog Emergency Through the Earth Communication System developed by E-Spectrum Technologies. The Rescue Dog is a two-way extended-range portable through-the-Earth solution that was developed in the US in cooperation with The National Institute for Occupational Safety and Health (or NIOSH) which does not rely on large loop surface antennas for signal transmission. New non-portable systems have also been developed by companies such as Lockheed Martin for use in emergency chambers to provide post-accident, two-way, emergency voice and text communications independent of surface or in-mine infrastructure.

=== New technologies ===
A new wireless "Miner Lifeline" telecommunication technology is being tested in 2012 at the West Virginia Robinson Run mine (recent production 6,000,000 short tons (5,400,000 t) per year of coal using 600 miners). The system supports voice, text, or SOS sent on a "bubble" of magnetic waves, and "can move more than 1,500 feet (460 m) up or down and 2,000 feet (610 m) laterally, arriving in less than a minute."

The Israeli company Maxtech has developed a software system that automates the optimal organization of a set of limited-range communications devices, using any mixture of types of communication (through-the-earth radio, line-of-sight radio or optical, etc.). This system was used in the Tham Luang cave rescue.

Sybet developed an underground communication network system based on a large number of autonomous, portable transceiver nodes (BatNode) which operate in mesh architecture, forwarding voice calls over long distance with no radio connection between the end stations, as long as the BatNodes can see their neighbours.

== See also ==
- Project Sanguine
- Tunnel transmitter
- Leaky feeder
- Cave-Link
- Communication with submarines
- Caving equipment#Communication
- Earth transmission system (in French)
- Ground dipole
- Super low frequency (SLF)
- Extremely low frequency (ELF)
