= Nicholas Christofilos =

Greek physicist

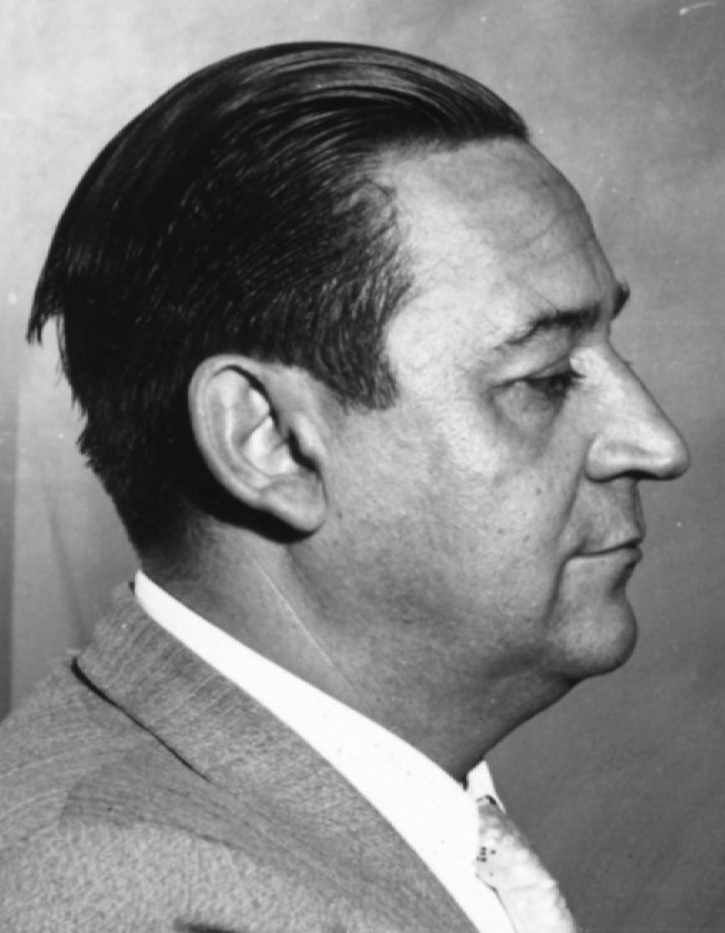
- Nicholas Chrisofilos
- Born: 16 December 1916; Boston
- Died: 24 September 1972 (aged 55); Hayward
- Education: National Technical University of Athens
- Occupation: Electrical engineer
- Known for: Christofilos effect; Astron; Field-reversed configuration; Ground dipole; Strong focusing; Operation Argus
- Awards: Elliott Cresson Medal (1963); Golden Plate Award (1964)
- Scientific career
- Workplaces: Brookhaven National Laboratory (1953–1956); Lawrence Livermore National Laboratory (1956–1972)

Nicholas Constantine Christofilos (Greek: Νικόλαος Χριστοφίλου; December 16, 1916 – September 24, 1972) was a Greek electrical engineer. The Christofilos effect, a type of electromagnetic shielding, is named after him.

== Career ==
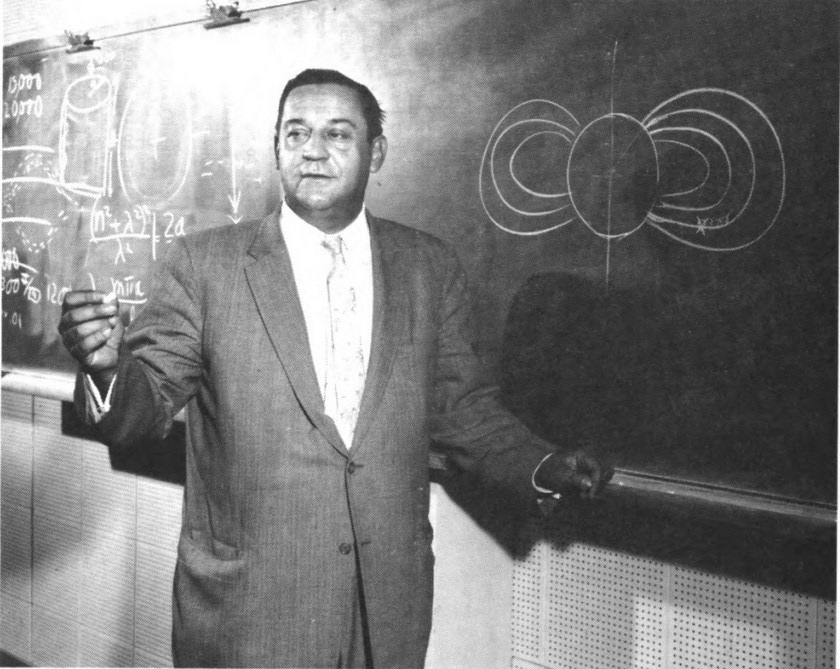
Christofilos discussing Operation Argus, having sketched the Van Allen radiation belts

Christofilos was born in Boston, Massachusetts and raised in Greece. He attended the National Technical University of Athens at age 18, and graduated with a degree in Electrical and Mechanical Engineering in 1938. He remained in Greece during World War II, working for an Athens elevator maintenance company during the German occupation. He later initiated his own elevator company. During all of this, he maintained an amateur interest in accelerator physics and high-energy particle physics, and studied German and American texts concerning the subjects extensively.

During 1946 he independently developed ideas for a synchrotron and in 1949 he conceived the strong-focusing principle for particle accelerators. Rather than publishing in a journal he submitted a patent application in the US and Greece. His discovery was unnoticed for several years, and strong focusing was rediscovered by Ernest Courant et al. in 1952 (who acknowledged his priority one year later), and applied to accelerators at Brookhaven National Laboratory (BNL), Cornell University and CERN.

Christofilos was offered a job at Brookhaven in 1953. In 1956 he joined Lawrence Livermore National Laboratory (LLNL) to continue his work on the Astron, a proposed fusion reactor planned during Project Sherwood. At LLNL, Christofilos worked on a number of military projects. He became a member of the JASON Defense Advisory Group and was the principal researcher for Operation Argus, a series of high-altitude nuclear detonations intended to create a radiation belt in the upper regions of the Earth's atmosphere as a defence against Soviet ICBMs.

In 1958 Christofilos proposed Extremely Low Frequency (ELF) waves as a way to communicate with submerged submarines, and subsequently invented the ground dipole, the only antenna that has proven practical for use at ELF frequencies. His ideas were implemented by the U.S. Navy as Project Seafarer, which constructed huge ELF transmitter facilities in Michigan and Wisconsin consisting of 56 miles (90 km) of electric transmission line. These were used from 1985 to 2004 for worldwide communication with U.S. nuclear submarines.

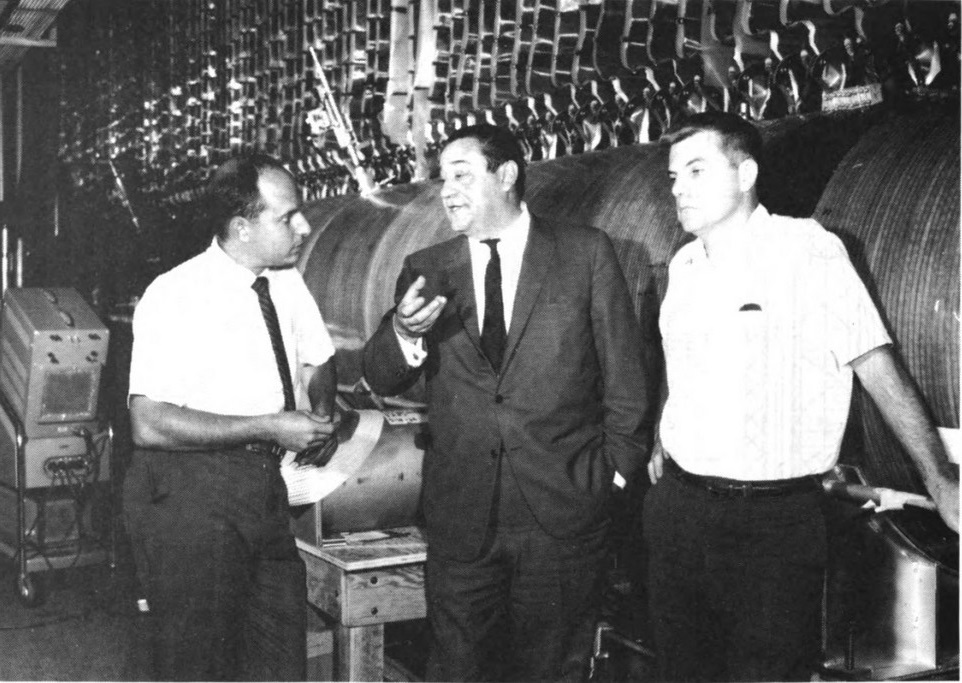
Paul Weiss, Christofilos, and Eugene Laurer in front of the Astron (fusion reactor)

In 1963 he was awarded the Elliott Cresson Medal.

Herbert York described Christofilos as follows:

Nick was a remarkable idea man. The ideas were usually not good, but they were really remarkable in that they were the kind of ideas that nobody else had. Nick really was a genius in a very important sense -- he often invented things that required two new ideas simultaneously, which is something that normally, hardly anyone ever does.
