= Leaky feeder =

Communication system used in mines and tunnels

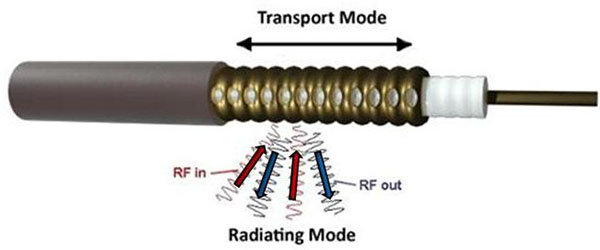
Diagram of leaky feeder cable

A leaky feeder is a kind of antenna used for communication in mines, tunnels, and other enclosed spaces. The commercial name radiating cable emphasizes that it is designed to radiate, unlike most cables.

== Principle ==
A leaky feeder communication system consists of a cable run along tunnels which emits and receives radio waves, functioning as an extended antenna. The cable is "leaky" in that it has gaps or slots in its outer conductor to allow the radio signal to leak into or out of the cable along its entire length. Because of this leakage, line amplifiers are inserted at regular intervals, typically every 350 to 500 metres, to boost the signal. The signal is usually picked up by portable transceivers carried by personnel. Transmissions from the transceivers are picked up by the feeder and carried to other parts of the tunnel, allowing two-way radio communication throughout the tunnel system.

The system has a limited range and because of the frequency it uses (typically VHF or UHF), transmissions cannot pass through solid rock, which limits the system to a line-of-sight application. It does, however, allow two-way mobile communication.

Due to the signal loss, a leaky feeder is usually used for frequencies under 1 GHz. Above that frequency, the losses require too many repeaters, thus making other options more effective. Antennae (omni, panel or bi-directional) or even distributed antenna systems are more often used for higher frequency bands.

== Applications ==
Leaky feeder antenna installed in a pedestrian tunnel.

=== Mining ===
Leaky feeders are used in the mining industry for wireless communication between miners. The system is used as a primary communication system with a transceiver small enough to be comfortably worn for an entire shift.

=== Underground railways ===
The leaky feeder system is used for underground mobile communication in mass transit railways. In Delhi, Hong Kong, and Copenhagen, leaky feeders were installed during construction. This gives emergency services seamless mobile communication from underground to the surface.

The London Underground uses a leaky feeder system for its internal communication network Connect. However, the communication used by the emergency services, Airwave, was not compatible and did not work below ground. The fact that this situation continued to exist after the 1987 King's Cross fire was criticised in the reports from the 7 July 2005 London bombings, where it hampered rescue efforts. In March 2020, two additional leaky feeder cables were brought online in the Jubilee line extension tunnels between Canning Town and Westminster. One of these cables provided commercial 4G coverage for passengers, both in the tunnels and on station platforms, whilst the second cable provided coverage for the Home Office's Emergency Services Network (ESN), which is currently being rolled out to replace the ageing Airwave network. This trial section is the first to be brought online as part of a project to provide both commercial 4G coverage and ESN coverage across the entire Tube network.

Tyne and Wear Metro was the first railway in the UK to use leaky feeder cables for public mobile phone connectivity, in its city-centre underground tunnels. Initially this was a 2G signal, but then mobile operator EE upgraded this to 4G for their customers. As of 2023, operator Nexus are planning a comprehensive upgrade to mobile data coverage, including in the tunnels.

An alternative to using leaky feeder in underground railways is to use Distributed Antenna System (DAS). A DAS system was deployed in some New York City Subway stations by Transit Wireless to provide Wi‑Fi and mobile phone and data coverage for customers.

=== In-flight wireless networks ===
Leaky feeder antenna systems can also be used to allow use of onboard mobile phones and Wi‑Fi on passenger aircraft. The weight and space requirements of leaky feeder systems are usually lower than comparable antenna systems, thus saving space and fuel. The even field strengths produced by runs of leaky feeders spanning the entire fuselage improve coverage while requiring less transmitting power.

=== Industrial buildings ===
Leaky feeders are used in hotels, warehouses and other industrial buildings where it is difficult to get Wi‑Fi coverage using normal access points. Some installations have 50–75 meters of leaky wire connected to the antenna output of each access point.

=== RFID ===
A leaky feeder modified with metallic strips can be used as a radio-frequency identification (RFID) antenna.

== See also ==
- Tunnel transmitter
- Through the earth mine communications
