= Super low frequency =

Range 30-300 Hz of the electromagnetic spectrum

- Frequency range: 30 to 300 Hz
- Wavelength range: 10,000 to 1,000 km

Super low frequency (SLF) is the ITU designation for electromagnetic waves (radio waves) in the frequency range between 30 hertz and 300 hertz. They have corresponding wavelengths of 10,000 to 1,000 kilometers. This frequency range includes the frequencies of AC power grids (50 hertz and 60 hertz). Another conflicting designation which includes this frequency range is Extremely Low Frequency (ELF), which in some contexts refers to all frequencies up to 300 hertz.

Because of the extreme difficulty of building transmitters that can generate such long waves, frequencies in this range have been used in very few artificial communication systems. However, SLF waves can penetrate seawater to a depth of hundreds of meters. Therefore, in recent decades the U.S., Russian and Indian militaries have built huge radio transmitters using SLF frequencies to communicate with their submarines. The U.S. naval service is called Seafarer and operates at 76 hertz. It became operational in 1989 but was discontinued in 2004 due to advances in VLF communication systems. The Russian service is called ZEVS and operates at 82 hertz. The Indian Navy has an operational ELF communication facility at the INS Kattabomman naval base to communicate with its Arihant class and Akula class submarines.

The requirements for receivers at SLF frequencies are less stringent than for transmitters, because the signal strength (set by atmospheric noise) is far above the noise floor of the receiver, so small, inefficient antennas can be used. Radio amateurs have received signals in this range using simple receivers built around personal computers, with coil or loop antennas connected to the PCs sound card. Signals are analysed by a software fast Fourier transform algorithm and converted into audible sound.

== See also ==
- Communication with submarines

== External articles ==
- Tomislav Stimac, "Definition of frequency bands (VLF, ELF... etc.)". IK1QFK Home Page (vlf.it).
- NASA live streaming ELF -> VLF Receiver
