= In-Building Cellular Enhancement System =

An in-building cellular enhancement system, commonly implemented in conjunction with a distributed antenna system (DAS), is a telecommunications solution which is used to extend and distribute the cellular signal of a given mobile network operator (hereafter abbreviated as an MNO) within a building. In the United States, operators commonly supported by such solutions include AT&T Mobility, Verizon Wireless, Sprint Corporation, T-Mobile US, in addition to smaller regional carriers as required. Below ground level, large buildings and high rises are examples where mobile phones are unable to properly reach the carrier's macro or outdoor network. In these environments, the in-building cellular enhancement system will connect to the carrier's signal source which is typically a bi-directional amplifier or a base transceiver station. This signal source transmits (and receives) the mobile network operator's licensed radio frequency. This frequency is then transported within the building using coaxial cable, optical fiber or Category 5e/Category 6 twisted pair cable. In-building coverage antennas are strategically placed to provide the best overall coverage for users.

== Application independence ==
A cellular enhancement system does not read or modify the information represented within the radio frequency (RF) that passes through the system; rather, it reinforces the signal penetration of voice and data frequencies in low signal areas and in dead spots within structures,

== 2G to 4G migration ==
As the industry evolves, most MNO networks are now made up of 3G based services and are migrating towards 4G based services. In-building cellular enhancement systems designed for 2G or primarily voice-based services may not be sufficient to support 4G services since signal strength and signal quality specifications become more stringent as the applications move from a voice-centric paradigm to a high speed data-centric paradigm. Therefore, a system designed to provide good quality 2G services may be insufficient or unable to provide quality 4G services. Traditionally, MNO services have been delivered within two frequency ranges: the 800 MHz band and the 1900 MHz band. Additional frequency bands have been auctioned by the FCC resulting in increased capacity for the MNOs which are starting to implement 4G services in the 700 MHz and 2100 MHz frequency ranges.

== Passive in-building cellular enhancement system ==
A coaxial cable-only system is typically referred to as a passive system when all system components (other than the signal source) are coaxial cable, coverage antennas and other components that do not require AC or DC power to function.

=== Pros and cons of a passive system ===
A passive system is less expensive to install and is best suited for smaller buildings where one or possibly two MNOs need to be enhanced within the building and are not usually installed in spaces over 100,000 square feet (9,300 m^{2}). Passive systems require the RF power to be balanced among all the coverage antennas so there is uniform signal strength throughout the building. Expanding a passive system after the initial deployment could require a re-engineering of the entire system to ensure proper operation throughout the building. The number of in-building antennas and coverage area is dependent on the output power of the signal source.

== Active in-building cellular enhancement system ==
Systems that require conversion of the radio frequency into other forms, such as optical signals, use products that require AC or DC power to perform the conversion near the signal source. Additional products located throughout the building are then used to convert the signals back into native radio frequency format, which are then transmitted through the coverage antennas. Since the equipment at both ends of the cable require AC or DC power to operate, the system is considered to be active.

=== Advantages and disadvantages of an active system ===
An active system can be deployed in large buildings and/or within a campus of buildings by converting and transporting the radio frequency over optical fiber. Many active systems have been deployed covering areas of 1,000,000 square feet (93,000 m^{2}) and larger. Active systems are best suited when there is a need to support multiple MNOs or large single buildings or campuses with multiple buildings. Expansion of an active system is usually in the form of adding more active equipment to increase the number of coverage antennas within the building, to increase the number of MNOs, or to increase the service offerings of an MNO such as adding 3G or 4G services. In a properly designed active system, no reengineering or rebalancing of the original system is required when the system is expanded. Optical fiber systems can provide coverage in areas up to 2 km from the signal source making them ideal for campus environments. An active system will always be more expensive than a passive system.

== See also ==
- Distributed antenna system
- Microconnect distributed antenna
