= Ground dipole =

Radio antenna that radiates extremely low frequency electromagnetic waves

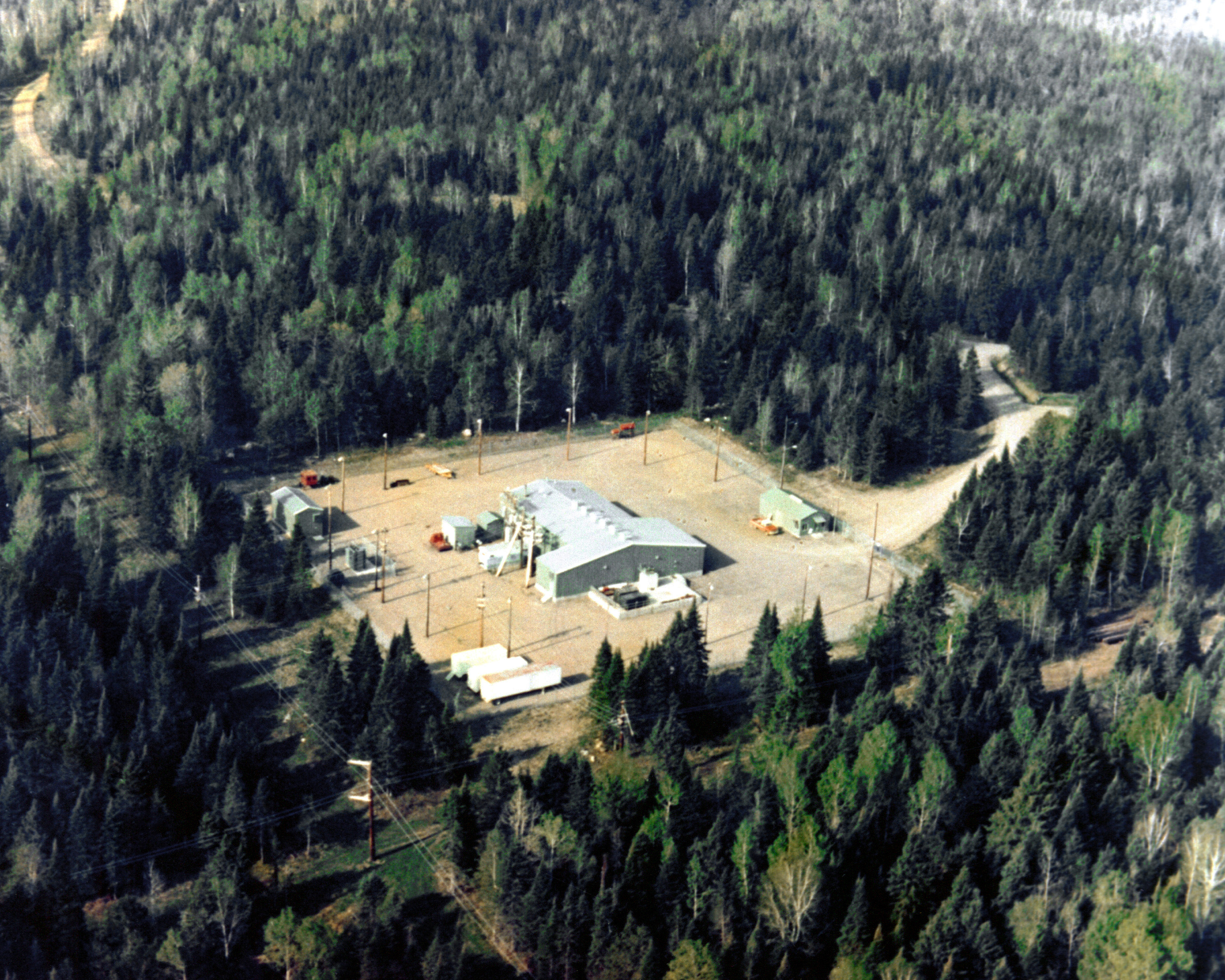
The U.S. Navy Clam Lake, Wisconsin ELF transmitter in 1982. Sections of the power lines that make up the two crossed ground dipole antennas can be seen passing through the forest at lower left.

In radio communication, a ground dipole, also referred to as an earth dipole antenna, transmission line antenna, and in technical literature as a horizontal electric dipole (HED), is a huge, specialized type of radio antenna that radiates extremely low frequency (ELF) electromagnetic waves. It is the only type of transmitting antenna that can radiate practical amounts of power in the frequency range of 3 Hz to 3 kHz, commonly called ELF waves. A ground dipole consists of two ground electrodes buried in the earth, separated by tens to hundreds of kilometers, linked by overhead transmission lines to a power plant transmitter located between them. Alternating current electricity flows in a giant loop between the electrodes through the ground, radiating ELF waves, so the ground is part of the antenna. To be most effective, ground dipoles must be located over certain types of underground rock formations. The idea was proposed by U.S. Dept. of Defense physicist Nicholas Christofilos in 1959.

Although small ground dipoles have been used for years as sensors in geological and geophysical research, their only use as antennas has been in a few military ELF transmitter facilities to communicate with submerged submarines. Besides small research and experimental antennas, four full-scale ground dipole installations are known to have been constructed; two by the U.S. Navy at Republic, Michigan and Clam Lake, Wisconsin, one by the Russian Navy on the Kola Peninsula near Murmansk, Russia, and one in India at the INS Kattabomman naval base. The U.S. facilities were used between 1985 and 2004 but are now decommissioned.

== Antennas at ELF frequencies ==
Although the official ITU definition of extremely low frequencies is 3 Hz to 30 Hz, the wider band of frequencies of 3 Hz to 3 kHz with corresponding wavelengths from 100,000 km to 100 km is used for ELF communication and are commonly called ELF waves. The frequency used in the U.S. and Russian transmitters, about 80 Hz, generates waves 3750 km (2300 miles) long, (Note: λ = c/f = (3×10^{8} m/s)/(80 Hz) = 3750 km) roughly one quarter of the Earth's diameter. ELF waves have been used in very few manmade communications systems because of the difficulty of building efficient antennas for such long waves. Ordinary types of antenna (half-wave dipoles and quarter-wave monopoles) cannot be built for such extremely long waves because of their size. A half wave dipole for 80 Hz would be 1162 miles long. So even the largest practical antennas for ELF frequencies are very electrically short, very much smaller than the wavelength of the waves they radiate. The disadvantage of this is that the efficiency of an antenna drops as its size is reduced below a wavelength. An antenna's radiation resistance, and the amount of power it radiates, is proportional to (L/λ)² where L is its length and λ is the wavelength. So even physically large ELF antennas have very small radiation resistance, and so radiate only a tiny fraction of the input power as ELF waves; most of the power applied to them is dissipated as heat in various ohmic resistances in the antenna. ELF antennas must be tens to hundreds of kilometers long, and must be driven by powerful transmitters in the megawatt range, to produce even a few watts of ELF radiation. Fortunately, the attenuation of ELF waves with distance is so low (1–2 dB per 1000 km) that a few watts of radiated power is enough to communicate worldwide.

A second problem stems from the required polarization of the waves. ELF waves only propagate long distances in vertical polarization, with the direction of the magnetic field lines horizontal and the electric field lines vertical. Vertically oriented antennas are required to generate vertically polarized waves. Even if sufficiently large conventional antennas could be built on the surface of the Earth, these would generate horizontally polarized, not vertically polarized waves.

== History ==
Submarines when submerged are shielded by seawater from all ordinary radio signals, and therefore are cut off from communication with military command authorities. VLF radio waves can penetrate 50–75 feet into seawater and have been used since WWII to communicate with submarines, but the submarine must rise close to the surface, making it vulnerable to detection. In 1958, the realization that ELF waves could penetrate deeper into seawater, to normal submarine operating depths led U.S. physicist Nicholas Christofilos to suggest that the U.S. Navy use them to communicate with submarines. The U.S. military researched many different types of antenna for use at ELF frequencies. Cristofilos proposed applying currents to the Earth to create a vertical loop antenna, and it became clear that this was the most practical design. The feasibility of the ground dipole idea was tested in 1962 with a 42 km leased power line in Wyoming, and in 1963 with a 176 km prototype wire antenna extending from West Virginia to North Carolina.

== How a ground dipole works ==
Ground dipole antenna, similar to the U.S. Clam Lake antennas, showing how it works. The alternating current, I, is shown flowing in one direction only through the loop for clarity.

A ground dipole functions as an enormous vertically oriented loop antenna (see drawing, right). It consists of two widely separated electrodes (G) buried in the ground, connected by overhead transmission cables to a transmitter (P) located between them. The alternating current from the transmitter (I) travels in a loop through one transmission line, kilometers deep into bedrock from one ground electrode to the other, and back through the other transmission line. This creates an alternating magnetic field (H) through the loop, which radiates ELF waves. Due to their low frequency, ELF waves have a large skin depth and can penetrate a significant distance through earth, so it doesn't matter that half the antenna is under the ground. The axis of the magnetic field produced is horizontal, so it generates vertically polarized waves. The radiation pattern of the antenna is directional, a dipole pattern, with two lobes (maxima) in the plane of the loop, off the ends of the transmission lines. In the U.S. installations two ground dipoles are used, oriented perpendicular to each other, to allow the beam to be steered in any direction by altering the relative phase of the currents in the antennas.

The amount of power radiated by a loop antenna is proportional to (IA)^{2}, where I is the AC current in the loop and A is the area enclosed, To radiate practical power at ELF frequencies, the loop has to carry a current of hundreds of amperes and enclose an area of at least several square miles. Christofilos found that the lower the electrical conductivity of the underlying rock, the deeper the current will go, and the larger the effective loop area. Radio frequency current will penetrate into the ground to a depth equal to the skin depth of the ground at that frequency, which is inversely proportional to the square root of ground conductivity σ. The ground dipole forms a loop with effective area of A = 1/√2 L δ, where L is the total length of the transmission lines and δ is the skin depth. Thus, ground dipoles are sited over low conductivity underground rock formations (this contrasts with ordinary radio antennas, which require good earth conductivity for a low resistance ground connection for their transmitters). The two U.S. Navy antennas were located in the Upper Peninsula of Michigan, on the Canadian Shield (Laurentian Shield) formation, which has unusually low conductivity of 2×10^{−4} siemens/meter resulting in an increase in antenna efficiency of 20 dB. The earth conductivity at the site of the Russian transmitter is even lower.

Because of their lack of civilian applications, little information about ground dipoles is available in antenna technical literature.

== U.S. Navy ELF antennas ==
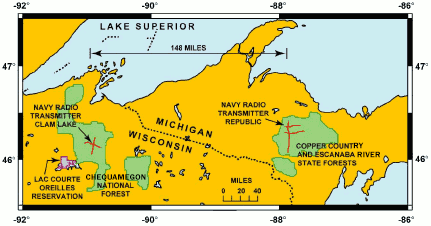
Map showing location of the US Navy ELF transmitters. The red lines show the paths of the ground dipole antennas. The Clam Lake facility (left) had two crossed 14 mile (23 km) ground dipoles. The Republic facility had two 14 mile dipoles oriented east–west, and one 28 mile dipole oriented north–south. The different shapes of the dipoles was dictated by land availability, and did not indicate a difference in design.

After initially considering several larger systems (Project Sanguine), the U.S. Navy constructed two ELF transmitter facilities, one at Clam Lake, Wisconsin and the other at Republic, Michigan, 145 miles apart, transmitting at 76 Hz. They could operate independently, or phase synchronized as one antenna for greater output power. The Clam Lake site, the initial test facility, transmitted its first signal in 1982 and began operation in 1985, while the Republic site became operational in 1989. With an input power of 2.6 megawatts, the total radiated ELF output power of both sites working together was 8 watts. However, due to the low attenuation of ELF waves this tiny radiated power was able to communicate with submarines over about half the Earth's surface.

Both transmitters were shut down in 2004. The official Navy explanation was that advances in VLF communication systems had made them unnecessary.

== Russian Navy ZEVS antennas ==
The Russian Navy operates an ELF transmitter facility, named ZEVS ("Zeus"), to communicate with its submarines, located 30 km southeast of Murmansk on the Kola Peninsula in northern Russia. Signals from it were detected in the 1990s at Stanford University and elsewhere. It normally operates at 82 Hz, using MSK (minimum shift keying) modulation. although it reportedly can cover the frequency range from 20 to 250 Hz. It reportedly consists of two parallel ground dipole antennas 60 km long, driven at currents of 200–300 amperes. Calculations from intercepted signals indicate it is 10 dB more powerful than the U.S. transmitters. Unlike them it is used for geophysical research in addition to military communications.

== Indian Navy antennas ==
The Indian Navy has an operational ELF communication facility at the INS Kattabomman naval base, in Tamil Nadu, to communicate with its Arihant class and Akula class submarines.

== Radiated power ==
The total power radiated by a ground dipole is

$$P = \frac {\pi^2 f^2 I^2 L^2}{2 c^2 h \sigma} \,$$

where f is the frequency, I is the RMS current in the loop, L is the length of the transmission line, c is the speed of light, h is the height above ground of the ionosphere’s D layer, and σ is the ground conductivity.

The radiated power of an electrically small loop antenna normally scales with the fourth power of the frequency, but at ELF frequencies the effects of the ionosphere result in a less severe reduction in power proportional to the square of frequency.

== Receiving antennas ==
Ground dipoles are not needed for reception of ELF signals, although some radio amateurs use small ones for this purpose. Instead, various loop and ferrite coil antennas have been used for reception.

The requirements for receiving antennas at ELF frequencies are far less stringent than transmitting antennas: (Note: The signal-to-noise ratio (SNR) is the limiting factor in all radio reception, and the limiting noise comes both from outside the receiver and from inside the receiver's own circuitry. The constraint this places on receiving antennas is they must intercept a strong enough signal to stand out from the external and internal background noise.) In ELF receivers, noise in the signal is dominated by the large atmospheric noise in the band. Even the tiny signal captured by a small, inefficient receiving antenna contains noise that greatly exceeds the small amount of noise generated in the receiver itself. (Note: Atmospheric noise is predominant at all frequencies below about 1,500 kHz.) Because the outside noise is what limits reception, very little power from the antenna is needed for the intercepted signal to overwhelm the internal noise, and hence small receive antennas can be used with no disadvantage.

== See also ==
- Communication with submarines
