= Submarine communications =

Submarine communications may refer to:

- Communication with submarines
- Submarine communication cables
