= Project Sanguine =

US Navy research on communicating with submarines

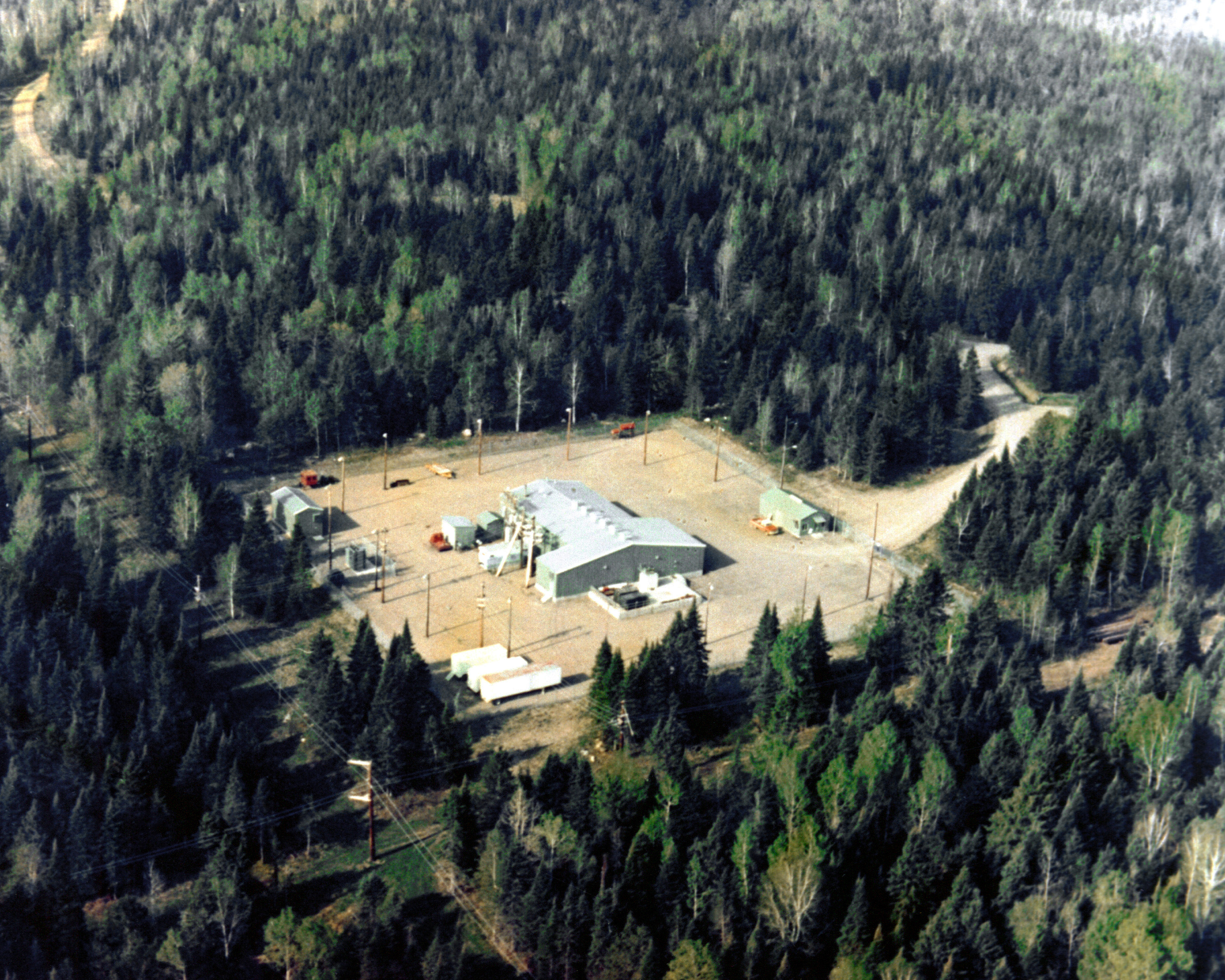
Clam Lake, Wisconsin ELF transmitter in 1982, part of Project ELF, the downsized successor to Sanguine. Sections of the rights of way for the power lines that make up the two 14-mile-long ground dipole antennas can be seen passing through the forest in the lower left.

Project Sanguine was a US Navy project proposed in 1968 for communication with submerged submarines using extremely low frequency (ELF) radio waves. The initially proposed system, hardened to survive a nuclear attack, would have required a giant antenna covering two-fifths of the state of Wisconsin. The proposed approach was never implemented because of protests and potential environmental impact. A smaller, less hardened system called Project ELF consisting of two linked ELF transmitters located at Clam Lake, Wisconsin (46°05′05.6″N 90°55′03.7″W) and Republic, Michigan (46°20′10.1″N 87°53′04.6″W) was built beginning in 1982 and operated from 1989 until 2004. The system transmitted at a frequency of 76 Hz. At ELF frequencies, the bandwidth of the transmission was very small, so the system could only send short-coded text messages at a very low data rate. These signals were used to summon specific vessels to the surface to receive longer operational orders by ordinary radio or satellite communication.

== Proposed system ==
The initially proposed system would have had a giant antenna consisting of 6,000 miles (9,700 km) of buried cables in a rectangular grid covering 22,500 square miles (58,000 km^{2}), two-fifths of the state of Wisconsin, powered by 100 underground power plants in concrete bunkers. The cables were grounded at their ends, and loops of AC electric current flowed deep in the ground between the ends of the cable, generating ELF waves; this is called a ground dipole. The original design was projected to cost billions and consume 800 megawatts of power. The goal was a system that could transmit tactical orders one-way to US nuclear submarines anywhere in the world, and survive a direct nuclear attack.

The project was controversial from the start and was attacked by politicians alongside antiwar and environmental groups concerned about the effects of high ground currents and electromagnetic fields on the environment. The nuclear survivability of the system was made doubtful by Soviet development of MIRV ballistic missiles. After an attempt to resite the project in the Llano Uplift of Texas was also stopped by public opposition, the Navy abandoned Sanguine and proposed a series of increasingly modest variants: Project Seafarer (1975), Austere ELF (1978), and finally Project ELF (1981), which was constructed. This lower power system required 15 minutes to transmit each code group, so it was not used to transmit tactical orders directly but instead served the function of a "bell ringer", ordering a specific vessel to rise near the surface and receive further orders by ordinary radio or satellite communication. The system became nominally operational in 1989, 20 years after it first went online as "test facility," and was used until 2004, when the US Navy declared it obsolete and it was shut down and dismantled.

== Project ELF ==
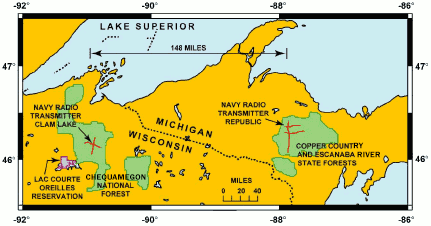
Map showing location of the US Navy ELF transmitters. The red lines show the paths of the ground dipole antennas. The Clam Lake facility (left) had two crossed 14 mi. ground dipoles. The Republic facility had two 14 mi. dipoles oriented east–west, and one 28 mi. dipole oriented north–south.

The scaled-down system the Navy constructed in 1969, called Project ELF, began official testing in 1982 and became officially operational in 1989. It consisted of two transmitter facilities, one at Clam Lake, Wisconsin and one at Republic, Michigan. with a total of 84 miles (135 km) of above-ground transmission line antenna. The two transmitters normally operated synchronized as one antenna for greater range but could also operate independently. The scaled-down system was not designed to survive a nuclear attack.

The Clam Lake facility, which served as the test site and was originally called the Wisconsin Test Facility (WTF), consisted of two 14-mile (23 km) transmission line antennas (called ground dipoles) in the shape of a cross, with the transmitter station at their intersection. The Republic facility consisted of three transmission lines, two 14-mile (23 km) and one 28-mile (45 km), in the shape of the letter "F" (the shape is not significant and was dictated by land availability). The lines, made of 1.5-centimeter (0.59 in) aluminum cable supported on insulators on 40-foot (12 m) wooden utility poles, resembled ordinary power transmission lines. The ends of the transmission lines were grounded by 1 to 3 miles (1.6 to 4.8 km) of buried copper cable and ground rods, later replaced by arrays of electrodes in deep 300-foot (91 m) boreholes The transmitters sent alternating currents of 300 amperes through the lines, which passed through the buried electrodes deep into the Earth.

Clam Lake ground dipole antenna, showing how it works. The alternating current I in the line is shown flowing in only one direction for clarity.

The transmitters operated at a frequency of 76 Hz in the extremely low frequency band, with an alternate capability at 45 Hz and used a combined power of 2.6 megawatts. They could communicate with submarines over about half the world's surface. The system transmitted continuously, 24 hours a day, sending an "idle" message when it was not being used so that submarines could verify they were within communication range.

Because of the extremely small bandwidth of the ELF band, the transmitters had a very slow data rate. They couldn't transmit voice (audio) but only short coded text messages of a few letters. Reportedly, it took 15 minutes to transmit a single three-letter code group.

The system was controversial and was the target of legal attacks, suits, and protests throughout its operating life. On five occasions, protesters cut down transmission line poles, interrupting operation briefly.

In 2004, the Navy shut down both transmitters, with the explanation that very low frequency (VLF) communication systems had improved to the point that the ELF system was unnecessary.

== How ELF communication works ==
Submarines are shielded by seawater from all ordinary radio signals and, therefore, are cut off from communication with military command authorities while submerged. However, radio waves of very low frequency can penetrate seawater; the lower the frequency, the deeper in the ocean they can penetrate. Waves in the VLF range of 3 to 30 kHz can penetrate to a depth of about 10 to 30 meters, and since WWII navies have used VLF transmitters to communicate with submarines. To receive VLF signals, subs must rise to just under the surface or trail a shallow antenna buoy, making them vulnerable to detection by the enemy.

Radio waves in the extremely low frequency (ELF) band of 30 to 300 Hz can penetrate to a depth of hundreds of meters, allowing them to communicate with submarines at their normal operating depth. The lower the frequency, the longer the wavelength of the radio waves, and transmitters require longer antenna structures to generate them. ELF transmitters use huge antennas called ground dipoles consisting of tens to hundreds of kilometers of overhead cables resembling ordinary power transmission lines. The transmission lines are grounded at the ends, and looping currents deep in the Earth form part of the antenna. Because even these huge antennas are much smaller than the ELF wavelengths, they are extremely inefficient; only a tiny fraction of the input power is radiated as ELF waves, with the rest dissipated as heat in antenna resistance. At their full input power of 2.6 MW, both US ELF transmitters working together only generated about 8 watts of ELF radiation. This weak signal reached submarines over half the globe only because of the extremely low attenuation of ELF waves of 1–2 dB per 1000 kilometers. ELF transmitters are most efficient when sited over certain low conductivity underground rock formations, which forces the currents to spread deeper through a larger volume of rock, forming a larger "antenna". The US system was located in Wisconsin and the Upper Peninsula of Michigan over the Laurentian Shield formation, for that reason.

Such ELF transmitters cannot be installed on submarines because of the antenna size and high power requirements. So ELF communication is one-way, with a receiver in the submarine receiving orders from a shore station but unable to reply. The low attenuation of ELF waves with distance allows a single ELF station to send messages to submarines worldwide.

Another drawback of ELF is that the ELF band has very small bandwidth and, therefore, can only transmit very simple messages very slowly. ELF signals cannot carry audio (voice) like other types of radio and can only carry short text messages consisting of a few letters. The US Navy system (above) reportedly uses three-letter code groups and requires 15 minutes to transmit one group.

== Other ELF transmitters ==
The US, Russia, India, and China are the only nations that have constructed ELF communication facilities. The Indian Navy has an operational ELF communication facility at the INS Kattabomman naval base to communicate with its Arihant class and Akula class submarines. The Russian Navy reportedly operates an ELF transmitter, ZEVS, located northwest of Murmansk on the Kola Peninsula in northern Russia.

== See also ==
- Extremely low frequency
- Ground dipole
- Communicating with submarines
- JASON Defense Advisory Group
- Through the earth mine communications
