= ZEVS (transmitter) =

Soviet/Russian submarine communication system

ZEVS is a facility of the Russian Navy to transmit messages to submerged submarines in deep water using extremely low frequency (ELF) waves. It is located near Murmansk on the Kola Peninsula. As ZEVS works on 82 hertz, it can be only used for very rudimentary transmissions. Due to its extreme low frequency, the techniques used by ZEVS are quite different from those of standard transmitters.

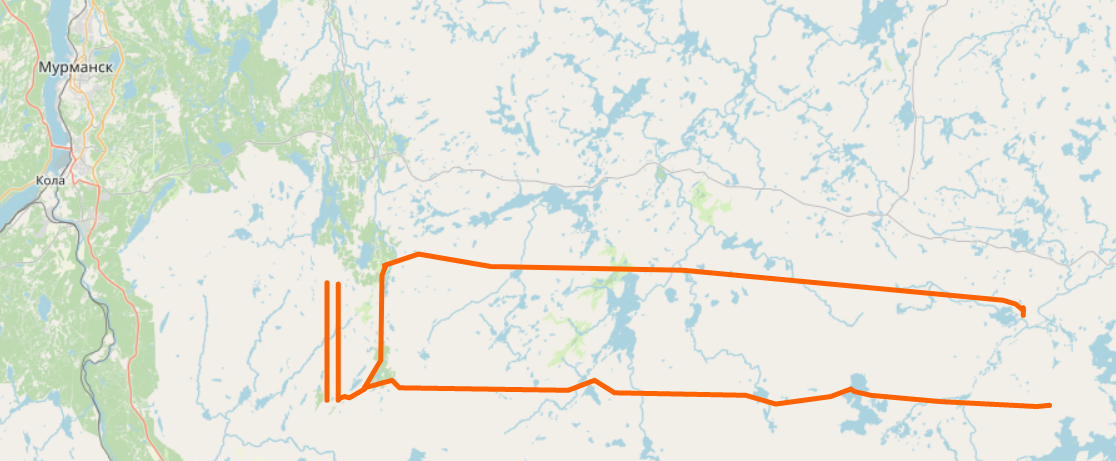
Track of the antenna system of the ZEVS transmitter

The antenna used by ZEVS is a ground dipole. This is simply an arrangement of two widely separated electrodes, through which the transmission current is fed into the ground.

As ZEVS is a location of high strategic importance, nearly no official information of the facility is available. Nearly all of the following information was obtained from satellite imagery, which can be seen on Wikimapia.

ZEVS consists of 2 units, situated at 68.813321°N 33.7517427°E and at 68.7163557°N 33.7078248°E. They are supplied by Kolenergo with electricity and have there the designation PS-373 (Cyrillic: ПС-373) and PS-393 (Cyrillic: ПС-393). These Kolenergo substations are designed for transmission ratings of 7.478 MVA and 7.446 MVA respectively, so the total transmission power of ZEVS transmitter may be between 10 MW and 14 MW, making it the most powerful transmitter in Europe.

From both units a feeder line of the ground dipole runs eastwards, ending at 68.778981°N 35.1515662°E and 68.7010474°N 35.2145822°E respectively. The grounding electrodes are wires running in east–west direction, laid just below the surface. They form a characteristic pattern on satellite pictures.

The feeder line of the other ground dipole electrode turns from the stations in southwestern direction and then running northward, to finish at 68.7948802 N 33.6278419 E and 68.7948802 N 33.6278419 E. As there are no traces of ground wires buried in low depth visible, rods running deep into the ground may be used there for the grounding.

== See also ==
- Project Sanguine – a US Navy ELF system
- INS Kattabomman – an Indian Navy ELF system
