= Microconnect distributed antennas =

Microconnect distributed antennas (MDA) are small-cell local area (100 metre radius) transmitter-receivers usually fitted to lampposts and other street furniture in order to provide Wireless LAN, GSM and GPRS connectivity. They are therefore less obtrusive than the usual masts and antennas used for these purposes and meet with less public opposition.

== Service provided ==
The service provided by microconnect distributed antennas cover a market in heavily populated urban area addressing mobile and radio connection. Also MDA is suited for bustling cities and historical areas where mobile connection and ability is impaired. Having many low power, small antennae preforms and covers an area equal to or better than a traditional Macrocellular site. The centrally located radio base station connects to the antennae by fibre optical cable. Each antenna point contains a 63–65 GHz wireless unit alongside a large memory store providing proxy and cache services. Also users will be able to obtain 64 kbit uplink/ 384kbit downlink service. Multiple operators can share this infrastructure. So that different service providers can this technology to benefit their customers.

== Four part MDA System ==
The four part MDA system is, the DAS (Distributed Antenna System) Master unit, access network optical fibre, and the Remote Radio over Fibre (RoF) Unit (Remote Antennae Points). Followed by the Supervisory and Management facilities. This system is compatible GSM (2g and 2.5G) and 3G network requirements of mobile users.

The MDA is an economical device that gives a somewhat low-cost solution to give more people access to mobile and broadband connection. This solution also has a low environmental impact that might not clutter up a historical part of an urban area. As communities become more and more dependent on technology solutions like the MDA system is perfect for protecting the natural beauty.

== See also ==
- Distributed antenna system
- In-Building Cellular Enhancement System
