= Communication with submarines =

Submarine communication

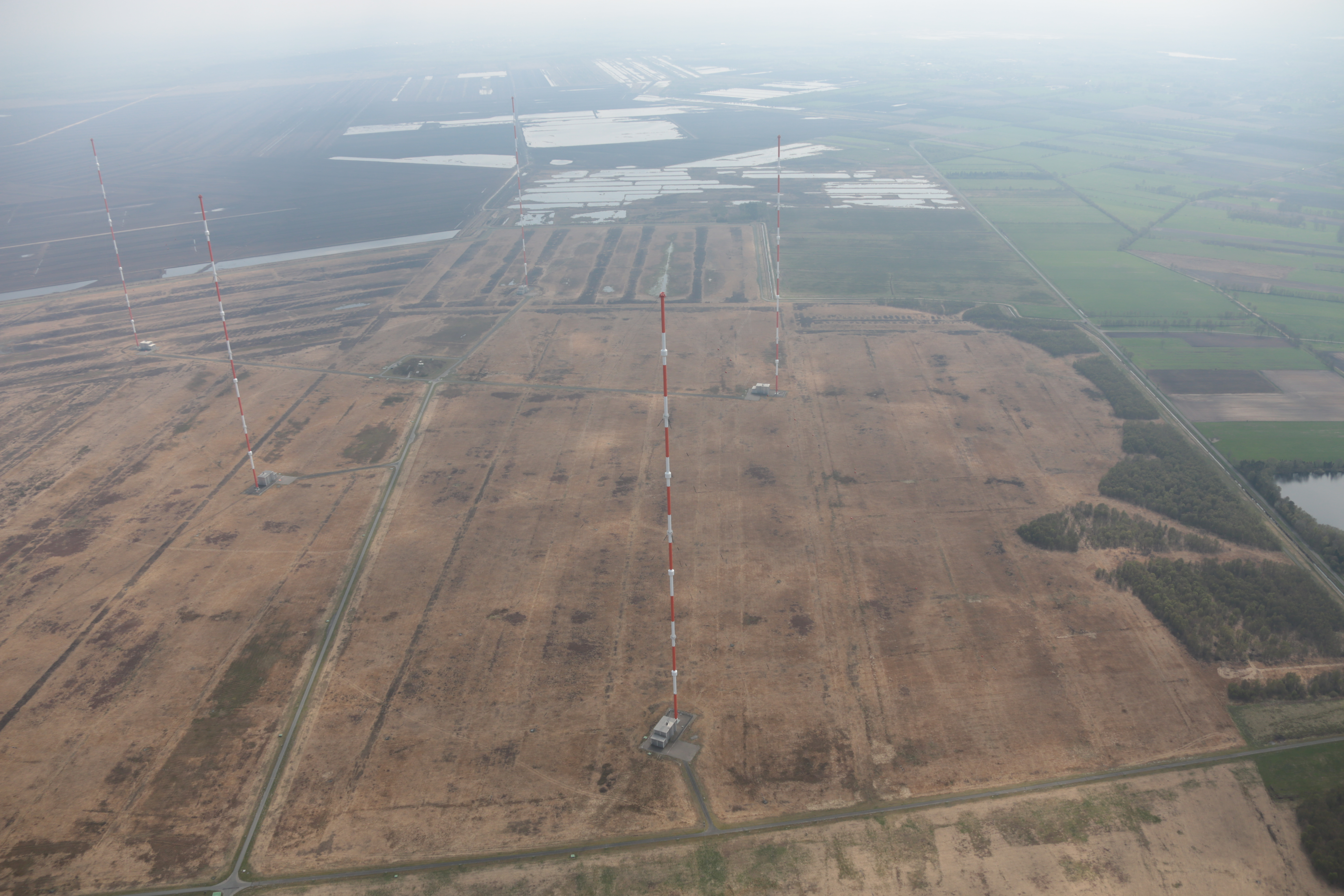
VLF transmitter DHO38, Germany, which has 8 masts with a height of 352.9 metres.

Communication with submarines is a field within military communications that presents technical challenges and requires specialized technology. Because radio waves do not travel well through good electrical conductors like salt water, submerged submarines are cut off from radio communication with their command authorities at ordinary radio frequencies. Submarines can surface and raise an antenna above the sea level, or float a tethered buoy carrying an antenna, then use ordinary radio transmissions; however, this makes them vulnerable to detection by anti-submarine warfare forces.

Early submarines during World War II mostly traveled on the surface because of their limited underwater speed and endurance, and dived mainly to evade immediate threats or for stealthy approach to their targets. During the Cold War, however, nuclear-powered submarines were developed that could stay submerged for months.

In the event of a nuclear war, submerged ballistic missile submarines have to be ordered quickly to launch their missiles. Transmitting messages to these submarines is an active area of research. Very low frequency (VLF) radio waves can penetrate seawater just over one hundred feet (30 metres), and many navies use powerful shore VLF transmitters for submarine communications. A few nations have built transmitters which use extremely low frequency (ELF) radio waves, which can penetrate seawater to reach submarines at operating depths, but these require huge antennas. Other techniques that have been used include sonar and blue lasers.

== Acoustic transmission ==
Sound travels far in water, and underwater loudspeakers and hydrophones can cover quite a gap. Apparently, both the American (SOSUS) and the Russian navies have placed sonic communication equipment in the seabed of areas frequently travelled by their submarines and connected it by underwater communications cables to their land stations. If a submarine hides near such a device, it can stay in contact with its headquarters. An underwater telephone sometimes called Gertrude is also used to communicate with submersibles.

== Very low frequency ==
VLF radio waves (3–30 kHz) can penetrate seawater to a few tens of metres and a submarine at shallow depth can use them to communicate. A deeper vessel can use a buoy equipped with an antenna on a long cable. The buoy rises to a few metres below the surface, and may be small enough to remain undetected by enemy sonar and radar. However, these depth requirements restrict submarines to short reception periods, and anti-submarine warfare technology may be capable of detecting the sub or antenna buoy at these shallow depths.

Natural background noise increases as frequency decreases, so a lot of radiated power is required to overcome it. Worse, small antennas (relative to a wavelength) are inherently inefficient. This implies high transmitter powers and very large antennas covering square kilometres. This precludes submarines from transmitting VLF, but a relatively simple antenna (usually a long trailing wire) will suffice for reception. Hence, VLF is always one-way, from land to boat. If two-way communication is needed, the boat must ascend nearer to the surface and raise an antenna mast to communicate on higher frequencies, usually HF and above.

Because of the narrow bandwidths available, voice transmission is impossible; only slow data is supported. VLF data transmission rates are around 300 bit/s, so data compression is essential.

Only a few countries operate VLF facilities for communicating with their submarines — Norway, France, the United States, Russia, the United Kingdom, Germany, Australia, Pakistan, and India.

== Extremely low frequency ==
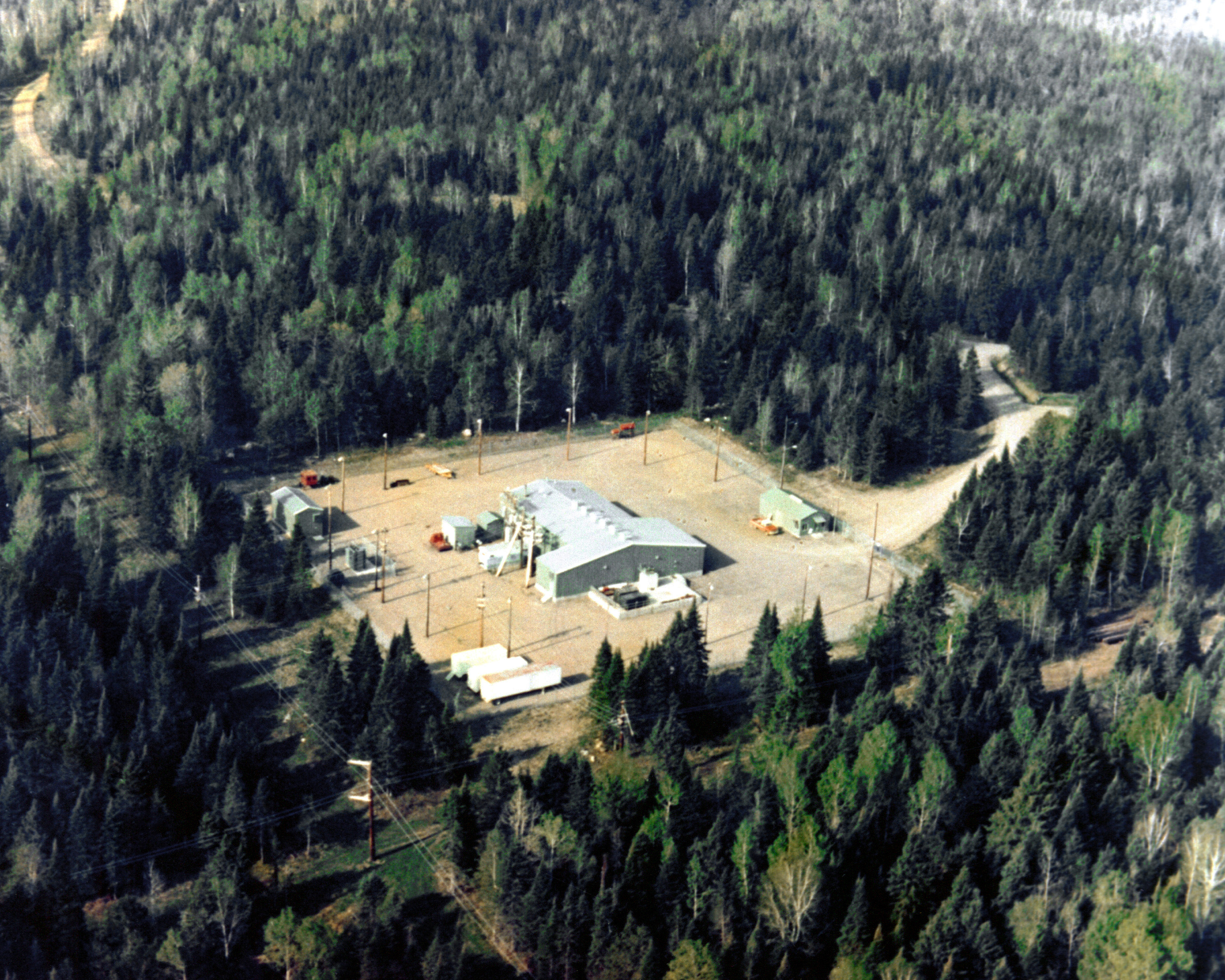
1982 aerial view of the U.S. Navy Clam Lake, Wisconsin ELF facility

Electromagnetic waves in the ELF and super low frequency (SLF) frequency ranges (3–300 Hz) can penetrate seawater to depths of hundreds of metres, allowing signals to be sent to submarines at their operating depths. Building an ELF transmitter is a formidable challenge, as they have to work at incredibly long wavelengths: The U.S. Navy's Project ELF system, a variant of a larger system proposed under codename Project Sanguine, operated at 76 hertz, and the Soviet/Russian system (called ZEVS) at 82 hertz. The latter corresponds to a wavelength of 3,656.0 kilometres. That is more than a quarter of the Earth's diameter. The usual half-wavelength dipole antenna cannot be feasibly constructed, as that would require a 1,800 km (1,100 mi) long antenna.

Instead, construction of such a facility requires an area with very low ground conductivity (a requirement opposite to usual radio transmitter sites), along with two large electrodes buried in the ground at different sites, and feed lines to them from a station in the middle, in the form of wires on poles. Although other separations are possible, the distance used by the ZEVS transmitter located near Murmansk is 60 kilometres (37 miles). As the ground conductivity is poor, the current between the electrodes will penetrate deep into the Earth, essentially using a large part of the globe as an antenna. The antenna length in Republic, Michigan, was approximately 52 kilometers (32 mi). The antenna is very inefficient. To drive it, a dedicated power plant seems to be required, although the power emitted as radiation is only a few watts. Its transmission can be received virtually anywhere. A station in Antarctica at 78° S 167° W detected transmission when the Soviet Navy put their ZEVS antenna into operation.

Owing to the technical difficulty of building an ELF transmitter, the U.S., China, Russia, and India are the only nations known to have constructed ELF communication facilities:

- Until it was dismantled in late September 2004, the American Seafarer, later called Project ELF system (76 Hz), consisted of two antennas, located at Clam Lake, Wisconsin (since 1977), and at Republic, Michigan, in the Upper Peninsula (since 1980).
- The Russian antenna (ZEVS, 82 Hz) is installed at the Kola Peninsula, near Murmansk. It was noticed by the West in the early 1990s.
- The Indian Navy has an operational VLF communication facility at the INS Kattabomman naval base, to communicate with its Arihant class and Akula class submarines. Beginning in 2012, this facility was being upgraded to also transmit ELF communications.
- China's own ELF transmitting station, the WEM (Wireless Electromagnetic Method) Project, was proposed as part of China's 11th Five-Year Plan in the field of major national scientific infrastructure projects. The station was built somewhere in or around the Dabie mountains in 2015. The broader WEM Project as a whole was completed by January 2020 and passed inspection later that year in September. Roughly the size of New York City, it can be used to communicate with its submarine forces without them having to surface.

=== ELF transmissions ===
The coding used for U.S. military ELF transmissions employed a Reed–Solomon error correction code using 64 symbols, each represented by a very long pseudo-random sequence. The entire transmission was then encrypted. The advantages of such a technique are that by correlating multiple transmissions, a message could be completed even with very low signal-to-noise ratios, and because only a very few pseudo-random sequences represented actual message characters, there was a very high probability that if a message was successfully received, it was a valid message (anti-spoofing).

The communication link is one-way. No submarine could have its own ELF transmitter on board, due to the sheer size of such a device. Attempts to design a transmitter which can be immersed in the sea or flown on an aircraft were soon abandoned.

Owing to the limited bandwidth, information can only be transmitted very slowly, on the order of a few characters per minute (see Shannon's coding theorem). Thus it was only ever used by the U.S. Navy to give instructions to establish another form of communication and it is reasonable to assume that the actual messages were mostly generic instructions or requests to establish a different form of two-way communication with the relevant authority.

== Standard radio technology ==
A surfaced submarine, or a submarine floating a tethered antenna buoy on the surface, can use ordinary radio communications. From the surface, submarines may use naval frequencies in the HF, VHF, and UHF bands, and transmit information via both voice and teleprinter modulation techniques. Where available, dedicated military communications satellite systems using line-of-sight frequencies are preferred for long-distance communications, as HF are more likely to betray the location of the submarine. The U.S. Navy's system is called Submarine Satellite Information Exchange Sub-System (SSIXS), a component of the Navy Ultra High Frequency Satellite Communications System (UHF SATCOM).

== Combining acoustic and radio transmissions ==
A recent technology developed by a team at MIT combines acoustic signals and radar to enable submerged submarines to communicate with airplanes. An underwater transmitter uses an acoustic speaker pointed upward to the surface. The transmitter sends multichannel sound signals, which travel as pressure waves. When these waves hit the surface, they cause tiny vibrations. Above the water, a radar, in the 300 GHz range, continuously bounces a radio signal off the water surface. When the surface vibrates slightly due to the sound signal, the radar can detect the vibrations, completing the signal's journey from the underwater speaker to an in-air receiver. The technology is called TARF (Translational Acoustic-RF) communication since it uses a translation between acoustic and RF signals. While promising, this technology is still in its infancy and has only been successfully tested in relatively controlled environments with small, up to approximately 200 mm, surface ripples, while larger waves prevented successful data communication.

== Underwater modems ==
In April 2017, NATO's Centre for Maritime Research and Experimentation announced the approval of JANUS, a standardised protocol to transmit digital information underwater using acoustic sound (as modems with acoustic couplers did in order to make use of analogue telephone lines). Documented in STANAG 4748, it uses 900 Hz to 60 kHz frequencies at distances of up to 28 kilometres (17 mi). It is available for use with military and civilian, NATO and non-NATO devices; it was named after the Roman god of gateways, openings, etc.

== Blue lasers ==
In 2009, a U.S. military report stated that "Practical laser-based systems for deep depths were unavailable, because lasers operating at the right color with enough power efficiency to be used in satellites did not exist. DARPA is striving towards a blue laser efficient enough to make submarine laser communications at depth and speed a near-term reality. A recently demonstrated laser will be matched with a special optical filter to form the core of a communications system with a signal-to-noise ratio thousands of times better than other proposed laser systems. If DARPA can demonstrate such a system under realistic conditions, it would dramatically change how submarines can communicate and operate, thereby greatly enhancing mission effectiveness, for example, in anti-submarine warfare."

== See also ==
- Extremely low frequency
- Ground dipole
- Super low frequency
- TACAMO, radio system intended to survive nuclear attack
