= Magnetic pulsations =

Oscillations in a planet's magnetic field

Magnetic pulsations are extremely low frequency disturbances in the Earth's magnetosphere driven by its interactions with the solar wind. These variations in the planet's magnetic field can oscillate for multiple hours when a solar wind driving force strikes a resonance. This is a form of Kelvin–Helmholtz instability. The intensity, frequency, and orientation of these variations are measured by Intermagnet.

In 1964, the International Association of Geomagnetism and Aeronomy (IAGA) proposed a classification of magnetic pulsations into continuous pulsations (Pc) and irregular pulsations (Pi).
