= Distributed antenna system =

Network of spatially separated antennas connected to a common source

A diagram contrasting a single antenna configuration with DAS

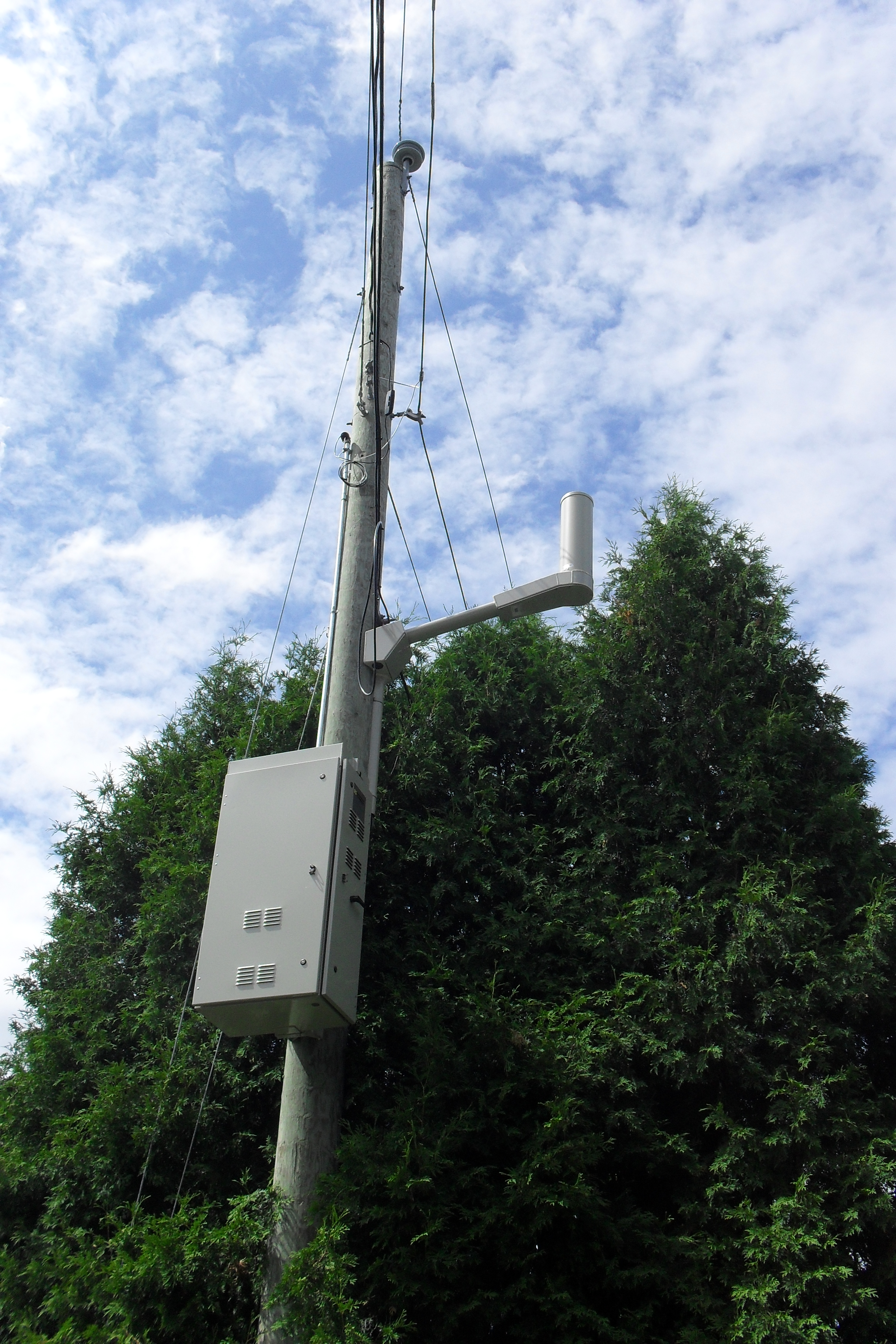
A typical DAS node for the Videotron 3G network in Montreal, Quebec

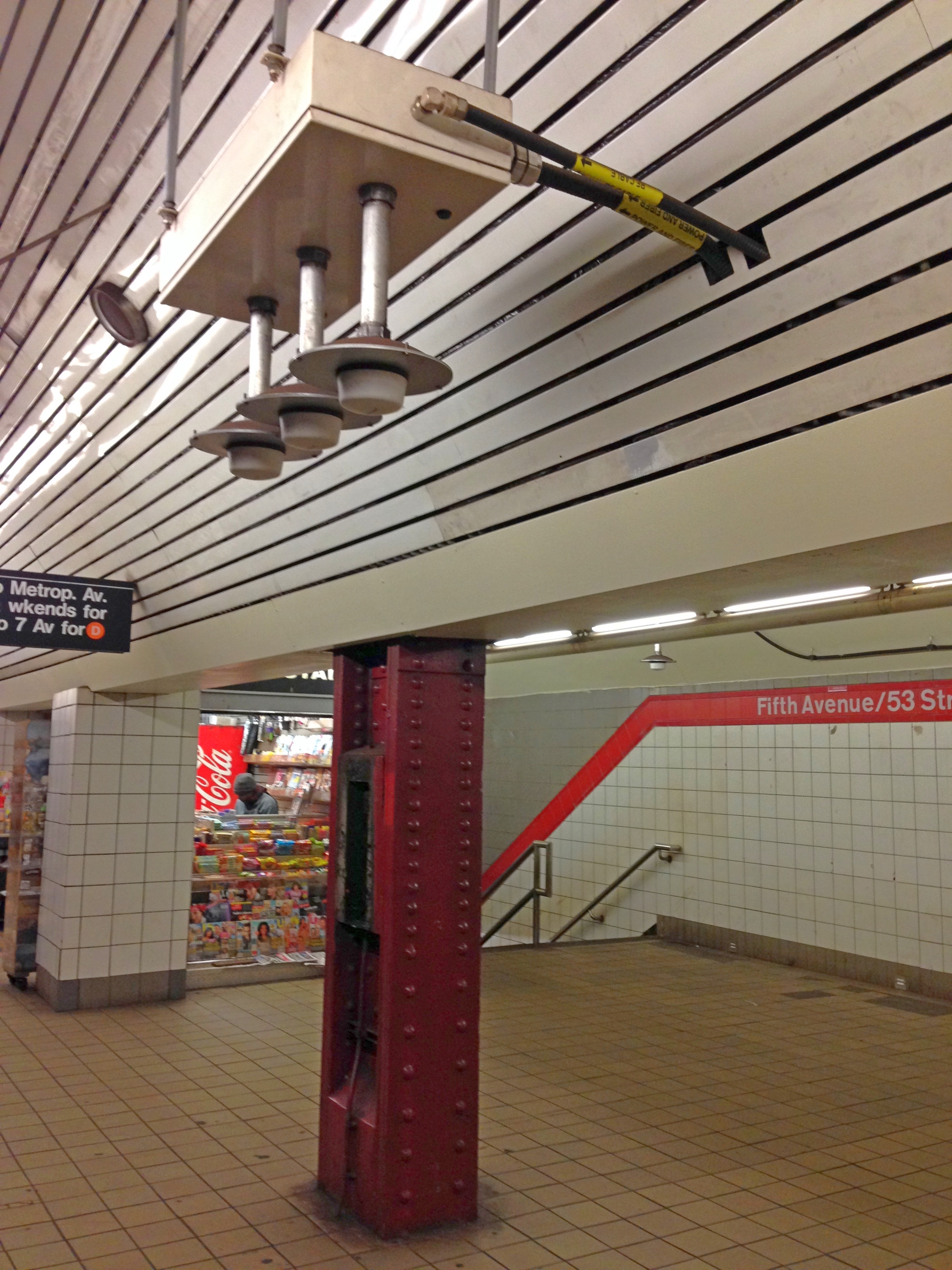
DAS deployed by Transit Wireless in New York City Subway to provide WiFi, cellular voice and data coverage. The RF node with three antennas was at the platform and another antenna near the stairs on the far side.

A distributed antenna system (DAS) is a network of spatially separated antenna nodes connected to a common source via a transport medium that provides wireless service within a geographic area or structure. DAS antenna elevations are generally at or below the clutter level, and node installations are compact. A distributed antenna system may be deployed indoors (an iDAS) or outdoors (an oDAS).

== Concept ==
As illustrated in the figure, the idea is to split the transmitted power among several antenna elements, separated in space so as to provide coverage over the same area as a single antenna but with reduced total power and improved reliability. A single antenna radiating at high power (a) is replaced by a group of low-power antennas to cover the same area (b). The idea was described in a paper by Saleh et al. in 1987. These antennas have recently been employed by several service providers in many areas around the United States. DAS is often used in scenarios where alternate technologies are infeasible due to terrain or zoning challenges.

The idea works because less power is wasted in overcoming penetration and shadowing losses, and because a line-of-sight channel is present more frequently, leading to reduced fade depths and reduced delay spread. By distributing antennas throughout a facility, DAS installations reduce the need for high-powered transmitters and help maintain signal quality in areas with structural interference.

A distributed antenna system can be implemented using passive splitters and feeders, or active-repeater amplifiers can be included to overcome the feeder losses. In systems where equalization is applied, it may be desirable to introduce delays between the antenna elements. This artificially increases delay spread in areas of overlapped coverage, permitting quality improvements via time diversity.

If a given area is covered by many distributed antenna elements rather than a single antenna, then the total radiated power is reduced by approximately a factor N^{1–n/2} and the power per antenna is reduced by a factor N^{n/2} where a simple power-law path-loss model with path-loss exponent n is assumed. As an alternative, the total area covered could be extended for a given limit of effective radiated power, which may be important to ensure compliance with safety limits on radiation into the human body.

== Precursors ==
Prior to the invention by Saleh et al., tunnel transmitters and leaky feeders had been used to provide radio reception in tunnels, mines, subway lines, and other indoor and underground spaces.

== Use in WiFi networks ==
Distributed antenna systems can be used to propagate indoor WiFi in large buildings, with multiple low-power antennas providing more consistent coverage than a single high-power transmitter. It is estimated that only about 5% of commercial WiFi use a distributed antenna system.

== Placement of distributed antenna systems ==
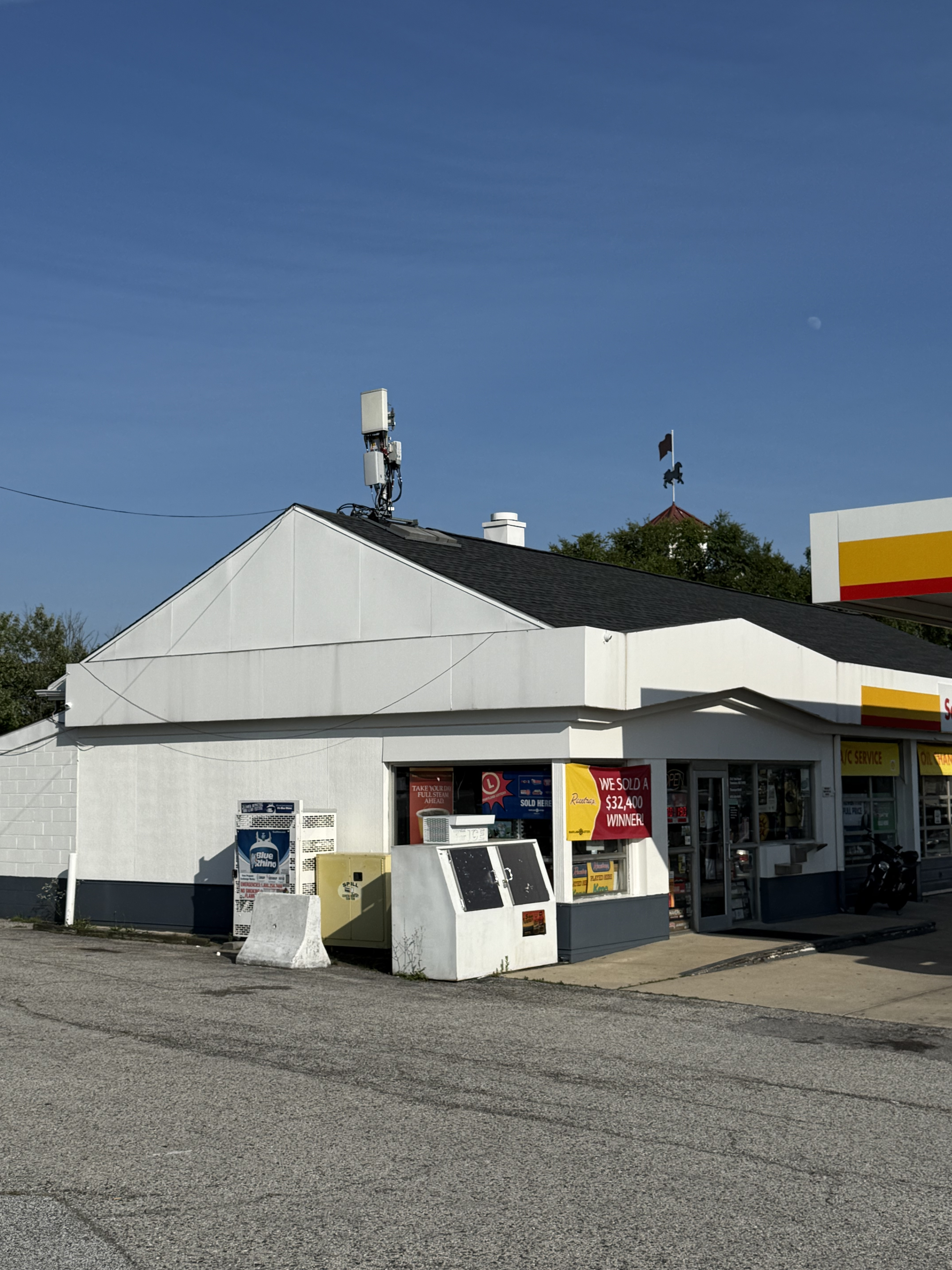
A Verizon DAS deployed at a Shell gas station (Cockeysville, MD)

Distributed antenna systems may be placed inside buildings for increasing wireless signals within buildings. Often they are placed within large structures such as stadiums or corporate headquarters.

Systems are also placed in the utility right of way on top of utility poles, street light poles and traffic signal poles.

== Regulations ==
=== United States ===
Historical regulatory challenges arise at the federal, state and municipal levels. However, regulations have been getting promulgated at the state and federal level, with Midwest states leading the way with state level regulations. Industry resources like The HetNet Forum (formerly The DAS Forum) also address regulatory issues in their conferences and communicate the outcome through their websites.

Federal Communications Commission Rules: The FCC has promulgated the FCC Pole Attachment Order 11-50.

Michigan: The METRO Authority, which regulates access to the utility right-of-way determined in 2004 that Distributed Antennae Network Systems are part of the landline infrastructure, and hence are subject to state regulation via an administrative determination.

Ohio: The Public Utilities Commission of Ohio has issued a pole attachment rulings which require the utility to allow Distributed Antenna Systems in the utility right-of-way in August 2014.

New York: In the aftermath of the 9/11 attacks on the World Trade Center in New York, all public safety agencies understood the importance of radio systems. The solution was codified by the NYC Building Code Chapter 9, and NYC Fire Department Rule 3. All high-rise buildings in New York must have a dedicated wireless two-way communications system for fire department use. This system is called FDNY Auxiliary Radio Communication System (commonly Referred to as ARCS). Such systems are required under Section 907.2.13.2 of the New York City 2014 Building Code. These systems allow on-scene communications throughout a building of any size.

=== Australia ===
The Industry designs and builds DAS systems in line with the joint operator document known as the Multi Carrier Forum (MCF). Currently the industry operates under MCF2025, although there was a It's important to note that the terminology in Australia to describe types of DAS somewhat differs to other regions. For example a 'Passive DAS" globally often refers to an offair repeater based system, whereas in Australia that is not the case.

== See also ==
- Macrodiversity
- Microconnect distributed antennas
