= Emergency Services Network =

LTE radio network under development in the United Kingdom

The Emergency Services Network is an LTE radio communications network under development in the United Kingdom to provide unified communication for British emergency services. It is intended to replace the existing TETRA-based Airwave network in 2026, seven years after the original planned date of 2019, though this may be delayed.

The ESN is intended to offer the following services:

- ESN Air, to support emergency services aircraft
- ESN Connect, a SIM-only offer for vehicle modems and data-only devices
- ESN Direct, a push-to-talk and messaging product for smartphones

As part of the construction of the ESN, almost 300 extra 4G sites will be added to extend the reach of the EE network to more remote parts of the country. The ESN will also serve the London Underground network.

== History ==
In April 2014, the government announced the Emergency Services Mobile Communications Programme (ESMCP) to migrate emergency services to a 4G-based network, to be called the Emergency Services Network. One of the intentions of this program was to switch from the private Airwave network to an existing commercial network. The switch was intended to begin in 2017 and be completed in 2019 before the existing Airwave contract was set to expire.

Implementation of the network was split into three lots. In June 2015, O2 announced they would be pulling out the bidding process for providing mobile services which left only EE in negotiations. At this point Airwave was not listed as bidding for operating any part of the ESMCP. In August 2015 the delivery partner was named as Kellogg Brown & Root. Finally, in December 2015 EE was officially announced as the provider of mobile services and Motorola Solutions was named as the provider of user services.

In November 2022, Motorola Solutions announced that it was planning to end its ESN contract early.

In August 2024, BT and its mobile subsidiary EE entered a new contract with the Home Office worth £1.85bn to provide mobile services for 7.25 years.

In January 2025, the Home Office announced that IBM would be taking over the delivery of user services.

== Delays ==
In January 2017, the Public Accounts Committee announced that the ESN might not be ready for its December 2019 deadline. In September 2018, it was announced that Airwave's existing contract would be renewed until December 2022.

In June 2022, a procurement request was issued for up to three suppliers of TETRA Encryption Algorithm 2 radio devices, and other maintenance services. As of 2022, the ESN is now expected to start operations from 2026.

== ESN Beta ==
ESN Beta is a beta test network intended as a forerunner to the ESN. It is not intended to be used for mission-critical operations. This is to be followed by ESN Version 1.0, the first fielded version of the ESN service.
