= Radio =

Use of radio waves for communication

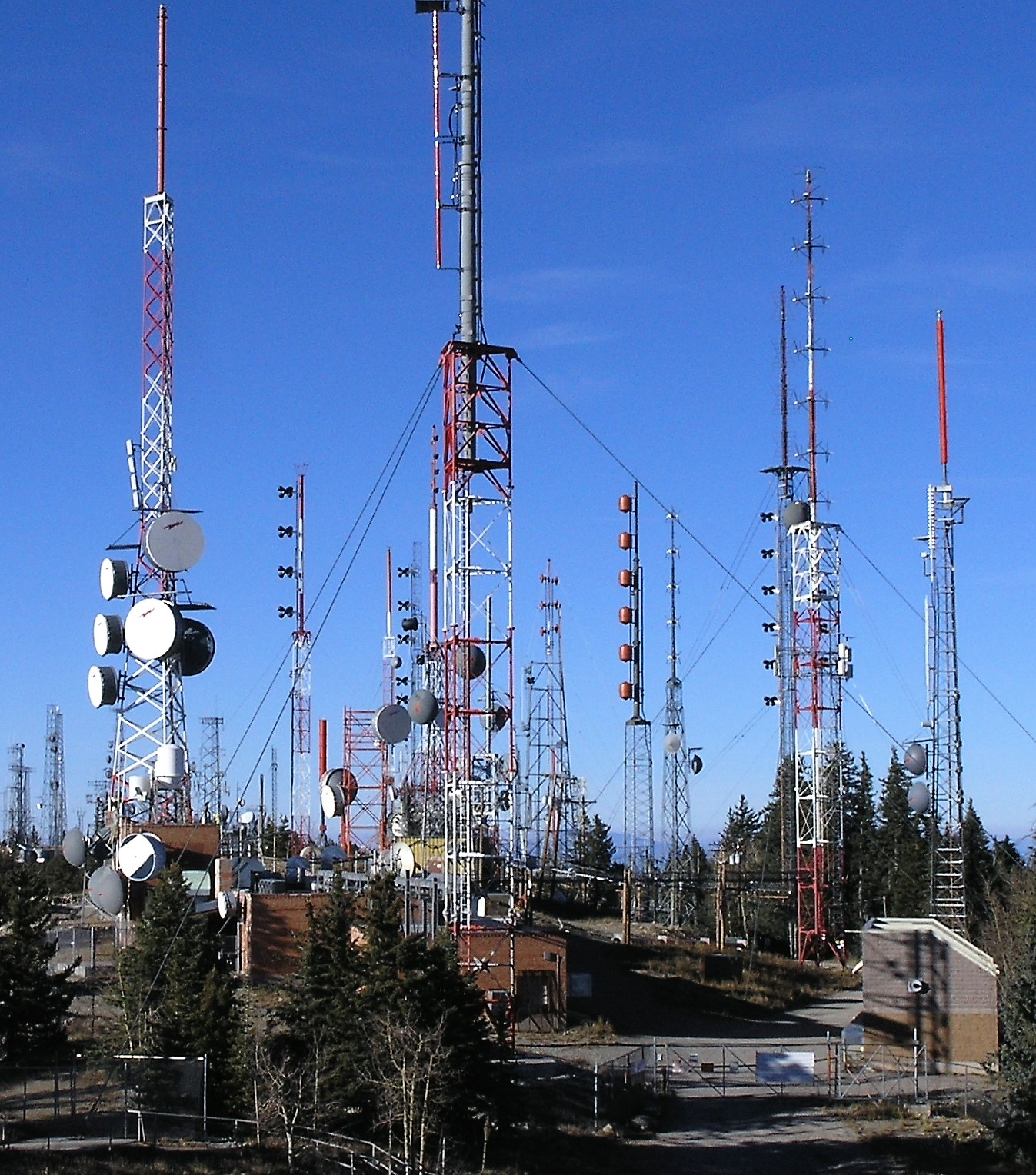
An antenna farm hosting various radio antennas on Sandia Peak near Albuquerque, New Mexico, United States

Radio is the technology of communicating using radio waves. Radio waves are electromagnetic waves of frequency between 3 hertz (Hz) and 300 gigahertz (GHz). They are generated by an electronic device called a transmitter connected to an antenna which radiates the waves. They can be received by other antennas connected to a radio receiver; this is the fundamental principle of radio communication. In addition to communication, radio is used for radar, radio navigation, remote control, remote sensing, and other applications.

In radio communication, used in radio and television broadcasting, cell phones, two-way radios, wireless networking, and satellite communication, among numerous other uses, radio waves are used to carry information across space from a transmitter to a receiver, by modulating the radio signal (impressing an information signal on the radio wave by varying some aspect of the wave) in the transmitter. In radar, used to locate and track objects like aircraft, ships, spacecraft and missiles, a beam of radio waves emitted by a radar transmitter reflects off the target object, and the reflected waves reveal the object's location to a receiver that is typically colocated with the transmitter. In radio navigation systems such as GPS and VOR, a mobile navigation instrument receives radio signals from multiple navigational radio beacons whose position is known, and by precisely measuring the arrival time of the radio waves the receiver can calculate its position on Earth. In wireless radio remote control devices like drones, garage door openers, and keyless entry systems, radio signals transmitted from a controller device control the actions of a remote device.

The existence of radio waves was first proven by German physicist Heinrich Hertz on 11 November 1886. In the mid-1890s, building on techniques physicists were using to study electromagnetic waves, Italian physicist Guglielmo Marconi developed the first apparatus for long-distance radio communication, sending a wireless Morse Code message to a recipient over a kilometer away in 1895, and the first transatlantic signal on 12 December 1901. The first commercial radio broadcast was transmitted on 2 November 1920, when the live returns of the 1920 United States presidential election were broadcast by Westinghouse Electric and Manufacturing Company in Pittsburgh, under the call sign KDKA.

The emission of radio waves is regulated by law, coordinated by the International Telecommunication Union (ITU), which allocates frequency bands in the radio spectrum for various uses.

== Etymology ==
The word radio is derived from the Latin word radius, meaning "spoke of a wheel, beam of light, ray." It was first applied to communications in 1881 when, at the suggestion of French scientist Ernest Mercadier, Alexander Graham Bell adopted radiophone (meaning "radiated sound") as an alternate name for his photophone optical transmission system.

Following Hertz's discovery of the existence of radio waves in 1886, the term Hertzian waves was initially used for this radiation. The first practical radio communication systems, developed by Marconi in 1894–1895, transmitted telegraph signals by radio waves, so radio communication was first called wireless telegraphy. Up until about 1910 the term wireless telegraphy also included a variety of other experimental systems for transmitting telegraph signals without wires, including electrostatic induction, electromagnetic induction and aquatic and earth conduction, so there was a need for a more precise term referring exclusively to electromagnetic radiation.

The French physicist Édouard Branly, who in 1890 developed the radio wave detecting coherer, called it in French a radio-conducteur. The radio- prefix was later used to form additional descriptive compound and hyphenated words, especially in Europe. For example, in early 1898 the British publication The Practical Engineer included a reference to the radiotelegraph and radiotelegraphy.

The use of radio as a standalone word dates back to at least 30 December 1904, when instructions issued by the British Post Office for transmitting telegrams specified that "The word 'Radio'... is sent in the Service Instructions." This practice was universally adopted, and the word "radio" introduced internationally, by the 1906 Berlin Radiotelegraphic Convention, which included a Service Regulation specifying that "Radiotelegrams shall show in the preamble that the service is 'Radio'".

The switch to radio in place of wireless took place slowly and unevenly in the English-speaking world. Lee de Forest helped popularize the new word in the United States—in early 1907, he founded the DeForest Radio Telephone Company, and his letter in the 22 June 1907 Electrical World about the need for legal restrictions warned that "Radio chaos will certainly be the result until such stringent regulation is enforced." The United States Navy would also play a role. Although its translation of the 1906 Berlin Convention used the terms wireless telegraph and wireless telegram, by 1912 it began to promote the use of radio instead. The term started to become preferred by the general public in the 1920s with the introduction of broadcasting.

== History ==
Electromagnetic waves were predicted by James Clerk Maxwell in his 1873 theory of electromagnetism, now called Maxwell's equations, who proposed that a coupled oscillating electric field and magnetic field could travel through space as a wave, and proposed that light consisted of electromagnetic waves of short wavelength. On 11 November 1886, German physicist Heinrich Hertz, attempting to confirm Maxwell's theory, first observed radio waves he generated using a primitive spark-gap transmitter. Experiments by Hertz and physicists Jagadish Chandra Bose, Oliver Lodge, Lord Rayleigh, and Augusto Righi, among others, showed that radio waves like light demonstrated reflection, refraction, diffraction, polarization, standing waves, and traveled at the same speed as light, confirming that both light and radio waves were electromagnetic waves, differing only in frequency. In 1895, Guglielmo Marconi developed the first radio communication system, using a spark-gap transmitter to send Morse code over long distances. By December 1901, he had transmitted across the Atlantic Ocean. Marconi and Karl Ferdinand Braun shared the 1909 Nobel Prize in Physics "for their contributions to the development of wireless telegraphy".

During radio's first two decades, called the radiotelegraphy era, the primitive radio transmitters could only transmit pulses of radio waves, not the continuous waves which were needed for audio modulation, so radio was used for person-to-person commercial, diplomatic and military text messaging. Starting around 1908, industrial countries built worldwide networks of powerful transoceanic transmitters to exchange telegram traffic between continents and communicate with their colonies and naval fleets. During World War I the development of continuous wave radio transmitters, rectifying electrolytic, and crystal radio receiver detectors enabled amplitude modulation (AM) radiotelephony to be achieved by Reginald Fessenden and others, allowing audio to be transmitted. On 2 November 1920, the first commercial radio broadcast was transmitted by Westinghouse Electric and Manufacturing Company in Pittsburgh, under the call sign KDKA. The broadcast featured live coverage of the 1920 United States presidential election.

== Principles ==
Radio waves are radiated by electric charges undergoing acceleration. They are generated artificially by time-varying electric currents, consisting of electrons flowing back and forth in a metal conductor called an antenna.

As they travel farther from the transmitting antenna, radio waves spread out so their signal strength (intensity in watts per square meter) decreases (see Inverse-square law), so radio transmissions can only be received within a limited range of the transmitter, the distance depending on the transmitter power, the antenna radiation pattern, receiver sensitivity, background noise level, and presence of obstructions between transmitter and receiver. An omnidirectional antenna transmits or receives radio waves in all directions, while a directional antenna transmits radio waves in a beam in a particular direction, or receives waves from only one direction.

Radio waves travel at the speed of light in vacuum and at slightly lower velocity in air.

The other types of electromagnetic waves besides radio waves, infrared, visible light, ultraviolet, X-rays and gamma rays, can also carry information and be used for communication. The wide use of radio waves for telecommunication is mainly due to their desirable propagation properties stemming from their longer wavelength. Radio waves have the ability to pass through the atmosphere in any weather, foliage, and at longer wavelengths through most building materials. By diffraction, longer wavelengths can bend around obstructions, and unlike other electromagnetic waves, they tend to be scattered rather than absorbed by objects larger than their wavelength.

== Communication systems ==
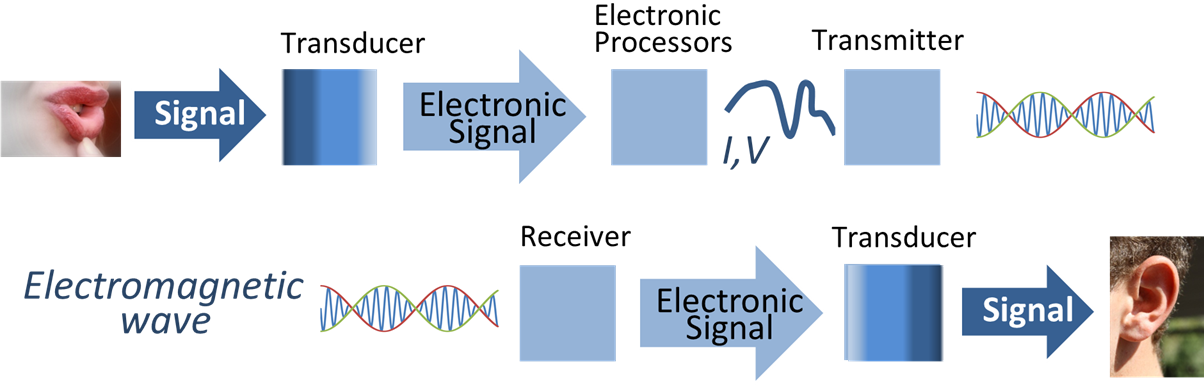
Radio communication. Information such as sound is converted by a transducer, such as a microphone, to an electrical signal, which modulates a radio wave produced by the transmitter. A receiver intercepts the radio wave and extracts the information-bearing modulation signal, which is converted back to a human-usable form with another transducer, such as a loudspeaker.

Comparison of AM and FM modulated radio waves

In radio communication systems, information is carried across space using radio waves. At the sending end, the information to be sent is converted by some type of transducer to a time-varying electrical signal called the modulation signal. The modulation signal may be an audio signal representing sound from a microphone, a video signal representing moving images from a video camera, or a digital signal consisting of a sequence of bits representing binary data from a computer. The modulation signal is applied to a radio transmitter. In the transmitter, an electronic oscillator generates an alternating current oscillating at a radio frequency, called the carrier wave because it serves to generate the radio waves that carry the information through the air. The modulation signal is used to modulate the carrier, varying some aspect of the carrier wave, impressing the information in the modulation signal onto the carrier. Different radio systems use different modulation methods:

- Amplitude modulation (AM) – in an AM transmitter, the amplitude (strength) of the radio carrier wave is varied by the modulation signal;
- Frequency modulation (FM) – in an FM transmitter, the frequency of the radio carrier wave is varied by the modulation signal;
- Frequency-shift keying (FSK) – used in wireless digital devices to transmit digital signals, the frequency of the carrier wave is shifted between frequencies.
- Orthogonal frequency-division multiplexing (OFDM) – a family of digital modulation methods widely used in high-bandwidth systems such as Wi-Fi networks, cellphones, digital television broadcasting, and digital audio broadcasting (DAB) to transmit digital data using a minimum of radio spectrum bandwidth. It has higher spectral efficiency and more resistance to fading than AM or FM. In OFDM, multiple radio carrier waves closely spaced in frequency are transmitted within the radio channel, with each carrier modulated with bits from the incoming bitstream, so multiple bits are being sent simultaneously, in parallel. At the receiver, the carriers are demodulated and the bits are combined in the proper order into one bitstream.

Many other types of modulation are also used. In some types, the carrier wave is suppressed, and only one or both modulation sidebands are transmitted.

The modulated carrier is amplified in the transmitter and applied to a transmitting antenna which radiates the energy as radio waves. The radio waves carry the information to the receiver location. At the receiver, the radio wave induces a tiny oscillating voltage in the receiving antenna – a weaker replica of the current in the transmitting antenna. This voltage is applied to the radio receiver, which amplifies the weak radio signal so it is stronger, then demodulates it, extracting the original modulation signal from the modulated carrier wave. The modulation signal is converted by a transducer back to a human-usable form: an audio signal is converted to sound waves by a loudspeaker or earphones, a video signal is converted to images by a display, while a digital signal is applied to a computer or microprocessor, which interacts with human users.

The radio waves from many transmitters pass through the air simultaneously without interfering with each other because each transmitter's radio waves oscillate at a different frequency, measured in hertz (Hz), kilohertz (kHz), megahertz (MHz) or gigahertz (GHz). The receiving antenna typically picks up the radio signals of many transmitters. The receiver uses tuned circuits to select the desired radio signal out of all the signals picked up by the antenna and reject the others. A tuned circuit acts like a resonator, similar to a tuning fork. It has a natural resonant frequency at which it oscillates. The resonant frequency of the receiver's tuned circuit is adjusted by the user to the frequency of the desired radio station; this is called tuning. The oscillating radio signal from the desired station causes the tuned circuit to oscillate in sympathy, and it passes the signal on to the rest of the receiver. Radio signals at other frequencies are blocked by the tuned circuit and not passed on.

=== Bandwidth ===
Frequency spectrum of a typical modulated AM or FM radio signal. It consists of a component C at the carrier wave frequency $f_c$ with the modulated information contained in two narrow bands of frequencies called sidebands (SB) just above and below the carrier frequency. The bandwidth (BW) is the amount of spectrum occupied by the sidebands.

A modulated radio wave, carrying an information signal, occupies a range of frequencies. The information in a radio signal is usually concentrated in narrow frequency bands called sidebands (SB) just above and below the carrier frequency. The width in hertz of the frequency range that the radio signal occupies, the highest frequency minus the lowest frequency, is called its bandwidth (BW). For any given signal-to-noise ratio, a given bandwidth can carry the same amount of information regardless of where in the radio frequency spectrum it is located; bandwidth is a measure of information-carrying capacity. The bandwidth required by a radio transmission depends on the data rate of the information being sent, and the spectral efficiency of the modulation method used; how much data it can transmit in each unit of bandwidth. Different types of information signals carried by radio have different data rates. For example, a television signal has a greater data rate than an audio signal.

The radio spectrum, the total range of radio frequencies that can be used for communication in a given area, is a limited resource. Each radio transmission occupies a portion of the total spectrum available. Radio spectrum is regarded as an economic good which has a monetary cost and is in increasing demand. In some parts of the radio spectrum, the right to use a frequency band or even a single radio channel is bought and sold for millions of dollars. So there is an incentive to employ technology to minimize the spectrum used by radio services.

A slow transition from analog to digital radio transmission technologies began in the late 1990s. Part of the reason for this is that digital modulation can transmit more information in a given bandwidth than analog modulation; the modulation itself is more efficient and loss compression further improves efficiency. Digital modulation also has greater noise immunity than analog, associated digital signal processors have more power and flexibility than analog circuits, and a wide variety of information can be transmitted using the same digital modulation.

Because it is a fixed resource which is in demand by an increasing number of users, the radio spectrum has become increasingly congested in recent decades, and the need to use it more effectively is driving many additional radio innovations such as trunked radio systems, spread spectrum (ultra-wideband) transmission, frequency reuse, dynamic spectrum management, frequency pooling, and cognitive radio.

=== ITU frequency bands ===
The ITU arbitrarily divides the radio spectrum into 12 bands, each beginning at a wavelength which is a power of ten (10^{n}) metres, with corresponding frequency of 3 times a power of ten, and each covering a decade of frequency or wavelength. Each of these bands has a traditional name:

Band name	Abbreviation	Frequency	Wavelength
Extremely low frequency	ELF	3–30 Hz	100,000–10,000 km
Super low frequency	SLF	30–300 Hz	10,000–1,000 km
Ultra low frequency	ULF	300–3,000 Hz	1,000–100 km
Very low frequency	VLF	3–30 kHz	100–10 km
Low frequency	LF	30–300 kHz	10–1 km
Medium frequency	MF	300–3,000 kHz	1,000–100 m

Band name	Abbreviation	Frequency	Wavelength
High frequency	HF	3–30 MHz	100–10 m
Very high frequency	VHF	30–300 MHz	10–1 m
Ultra high frequency	UHF	300–3,000 MHz	100–10 cm
Super high frequency	SHF	3–30 GHz	10–1 cm
Extremely high frequency	EHF	30–300 GHz	10–1 mm
Tremendously high frequency	THF	300–3,000 GHz (0.3–3.0 THz)	1.0–0.1 mm

It can be seen that the bandwidth, the absolute range of frequencies, contained in each band is not equal but increases exponentially as the frequency increases; each band contains ten times the bandwidth of the preceding band.

Though not defined by the ITU, the term tremendously low frequency (TLF) has been used for wavelengths from 1–3 Hz (300,000–100,000 km).

== Regulation ==
The airwaves are a resource shared by many users. Two radio transmitters in the same area that attempt to transmit on the same frequency will interfere with each other, causing garbled reception, often to the extent that neither transmission may be received clearly. Interference with radio transmissions can not only have a high economic cost, but it can also be life-threatening (for example, in the case of interference with emergency communications or air traffic control).

To prevent interference between different users, the emission of radio waves is strictly regulated by national laws and coordinated by an international body, the International Telecommunication Union (ITU), which allocates bands in the radio spectrum for different uses. Radio transmitters must be licensed by governments, under a variety of license classes depending on use, and are restricted to certain frequencies and power levels. In some classes, such as radio and television broadcasting stations, the transmitter is given a unique identifier consisting of a string of letters and numbers called a call sign, which must be used in all transmissions. In order to adjust, maintain, or internally repair radio transmitters, individuals must hold a government license, such as the general radiotelephone operator license in the US, obtained by taking a test demonstrating adequate technical and legal knowledge of safe radio operation.

Exceptions to the above rules allow the unlicensed operation by the public of low power short-range transmitters in consumer products such as cell phones, cordless phones, wireless devices, walkie-talkies, citizens band radios, wireless microphones, garage door openers, and baby monitors. In the US, these fall under Part 15 of the Federal Communications Commission (FCC) regulations. Many of these devices use the ISM bands, a series of frequency bands throughout the radio spectrum reserved for unlicensed use. Although they can be operated without a license, like all radio equipment, these devices generally must be type-approved before the sale.

Radio jamming is the deliberate radiation of radio signals designed to interfere with the reception of other radio signals. Jamming devices are called signal suppressors or interference generators or just jammers. During wartime, militaries use jamming to interfere with enemies' tactical radio communication. Since radio waves can pass beyond national borders, some totalitarian countries that practice censorship use jamming to prevent their citizens from listening to broadcasts from radio stations in other countries. Jamming is usually accomplished by a powerful transmitter that generates noise on the same frequency as the target transmitter. US Federal law prohibits the nonmilitary operation or sale of any type of jamming devices, including ones that interfere with GPS, cellular, Wi-Fi and police radars.

== Applications ==
Radio has many practical applications, which include broadcasting, voice communication, data communication, radar, radiolocation, and remote control.

== See also ==
- Electromagnetic radiation and health
- Internet radio
- List of radios – List of specific models of radios
- Outline of radio
- Radio quiet zone
