= Airwave Solutions =

British mobile communication company

Airwave Solutions Ltd.
- Type: Subsidiary
- Industry: Telecommunications
- Predecessor: BT Airwave / O2 Airwave
- Founded: 2000; 26 years ago
- Headquarters: Nova South, 160 Victoria Street, London, SW1E 5LB, United Kingdom
- Number of locations: Glasgow, Hemel Hempstead, London, Rugby, Slough, Warrington
- Area served: United Kingdom
- Products: Public safety network
- Number of employees: ≈600
- Parent: Motorola Solutions
- Website: www.airwavesolutions.co.uk

Airwave Solutions Ltd. is a British mobile communication company that operates the Airwave network, a mobile communications network used by Great Britain's emergency services. The Airwave network is based on the specialist Terrestrial Trunked Radio (TETRA) specification. Airwave was acquired by Motorola Solutions in February 2016 and now operates as a wholly owned subsidiary.

The Airwave network is due to be replaced by the LTE-based Emergency Services Network in 2026.

== History ==
Airwave was established in 2000 by BT as BT Airwave. BT Airwave along with BT Quadrant secured a Public Private Partnership (PPP) contract worth £2.5bn to supply of Professional Mobile Radio (PMR) communications to the police and other ‘blue light’ services. BT Airwave was part of the BT Wireless division which was spun off from BT Group in 2002 to ultimately become part of O2 and became Airwave O2 Limited, commonly known as O2 Airwave. In April 2007, Airwave was acquired by two Macquarie Group investment funds, Macquarie European Infrastructure Fund II (MEIF II) and Macquarie CPPIB Communications Pty Limited, for £1.9 billion. On 3 December 2015 the company was acquired by Motorola Solutions for £817 million. Some of the payment was deferred to the following year and Macquarie were supporting the transaction.

On 19 February 2016 Motorola Solutions announced it completed its acquisition of Airwave,

== Airwave Network ==
=== Performance during 2011 England riots ===
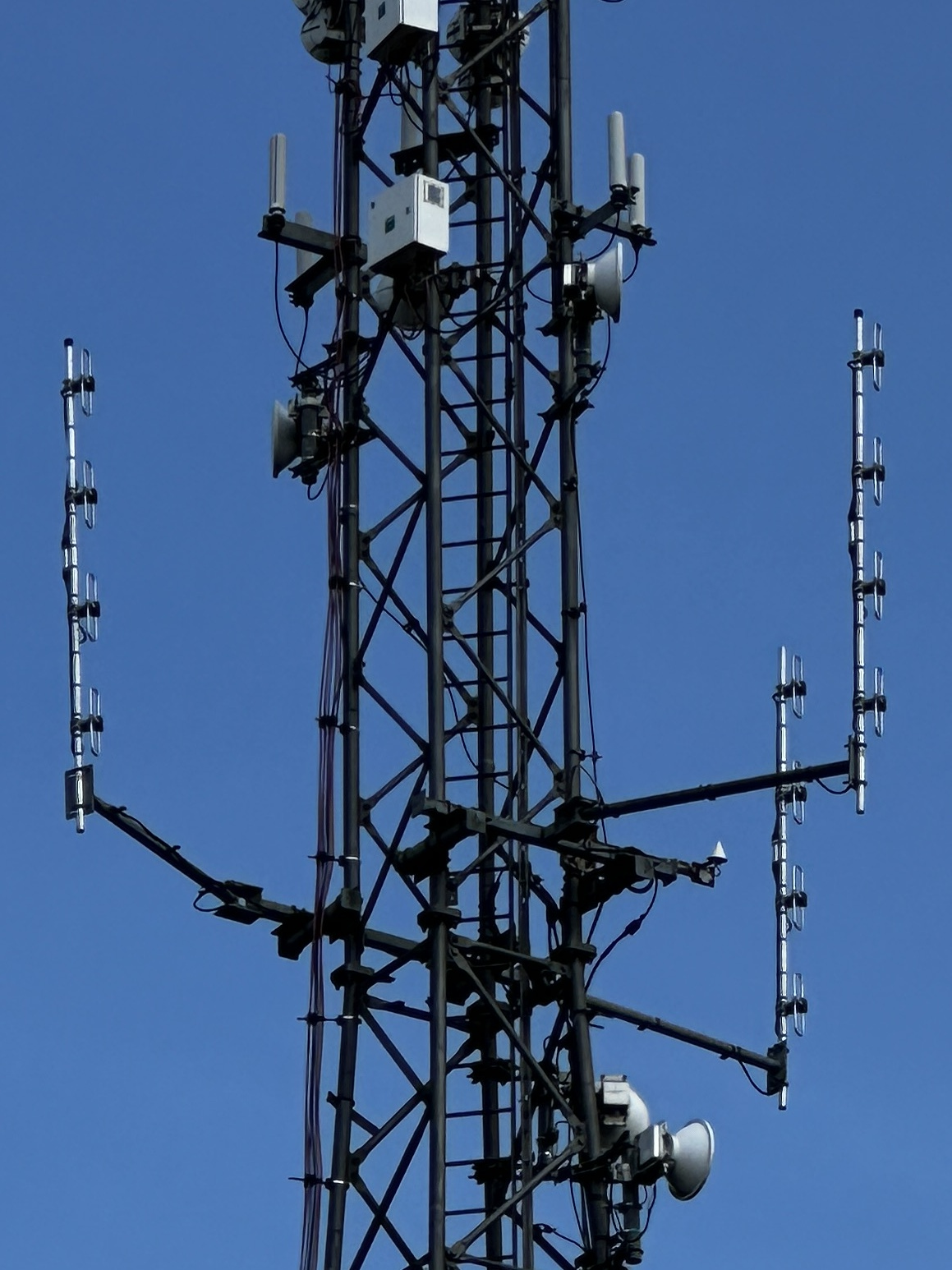
Antennas on an airwave mast

During the 2011 England riots, several police officers experienced "significant difficulties" with the Airwave equipment and were forced to use their own personal mobile phones to coordinate strategy during the riots. The Police Federation review speaks of "significant local technical difficulties" and a "significant communications failure", which was quoted in the Guardian newspaper.

However, the National Policing Improvement Agency (NPIA) responded that the network did manage to cover all 16,000 officers and that "[s]ome officers had to wait a few seconds for their calls to get through, but fundamentally, the network proved to be most resilient."

=== Performance during the 2012 Summer Olympics ===
On 27 January 2009, the organizing committee for the 2012 Summer Olympics confirmed that Airwave would provide private radio service for all venues during the Games using its Terrestrial Trunked Radio (TETRA) but with a new and independent communications infrastructure separate from the public safety infrastructure. The PMR network, named Apollo, provided voice communications for over 18,000 staff and volunteers from the London Organising Committee of the Olympic and Paralympic Games (LOCOG) during the 2012 Games.

== Replacement ==
In April 2014, the government announced the Emergency Services Mobile Communications Programme (ESMCP) to migrate emergency services to a 4G based network to be called the Emergency Services Network (ESN). One of the intentions of this program is to switch from the private Airwave network, to an existing commercial network. The switch was intended to begin in 2017 and be completed in 2019 before the existing Airwave contract was set to expire.

The implementation of the ESN has been subject to repeated delays. In January 2017, the Public Accounts Committee announced that the ESN might not be ready for its December 2019 deadline. In September 2018, it was announced that Airwave's existing contract would be renewed until December 2022.

As of 2022, the launch of the ESN has now been delayed to 2026. In June 2022, a procurement request was issued for up to three suppliers of TETRA Encryption Algorithm 2 radio devices, and other maintenance services.
