= Tunnel transmitter =

A tunnel transmitter allows wireless reception in tunnels. It consists of a receiving antenna which receives the signal to be radiated in the tunnel, and a transmitting antenna installed in the tunnel, which is either a Yagi antenna or a line antenna. In principle, a tunnel transmitter can work purely passively, in which case the received signal is passed over a cable to the antenna in the tunnel. Active systems, however, are more often used. In some cases the radio frequency inside the tunnel is different from the one used by the broadcaster. More often the program inside is transmitted on the same frequency as outside, in which case the information signal should be demodulated or converted to an intermediate frequency in the outside receiver, and then modulated/shifted back in the transmitter. Otherwise feedback may occur.

Tunnel transmitters are used in Germany only for audio transmitters working in FM-range and for further radio services, such as mobile phone services which also work in this frequency range. Elsewhere, there are also tunnel transmitters for audio broadcast transmitters, which work in the long and medium wave bands. An example of this is in the Dartford Crossing tunnel near London, where the programme "Virgin 1215" in the medium-wave band and the BBC's Radio 4 on 198 kHz long wave are rebroadcast in the tunnel. Emergency information could also be relayed using this system, interrupting programming to relay warnings.

== See also ==
- Leaky feeder
- Through the earth mine communications
