= Clam Lake, Wisconsin =

Census-designated place in Wisconsin, United States

- Census-designated place
- Location within the state of Wisconsin
- Coordinates: 46°9′50″N 90°54′7″W
- Country: United States
- State: Wisconsin
- County: Ashland
- Town: Gordon

Area
  - Total: 0.636 sq mi (1.65 km^{2})
  - Land: 0.370 sq mi (0.96 km^{2})
  - Water: 0.266 sq mi (0.69 km^{2})

Population (2020)
  - Total: 36
  - Density: 97/sq mi (38/km^{2})
- Time zone: UTC-6 (Central (CST))
  - Summer (DST): UTC-5 (CDT)
- ZIP codes: 54517
- Area codes: 715 and 534
- Website: www.clamlakewi.com

Clam Lake is an unincorporated, census-designated place in the town of Gordon in Ashland County, Wisconsin, United States. It is located on Wisconsin Highway 77 near County Highway GG. The entire area lies within the Chequamegon National Forest, an 860,000-acre area spread across northern Wisconsin. As of the 2020 census, its population was 36, a tiny decrease from 37 in 2010.

Situated near the headwaters of the Chippewa Flowage, the area encompasses several smaller lakes that host prime Musky fishing.

Clam Lake is well known as the site of the reintroduction of elk in Wisconsin with a herd of 25 in 1995 by the University of Wisconsin–Stevens Point, which has grown to an estimated 180.

Clam Lake is the site of a U.S. Navy extremely low frequency (ELF) transmitter site, used to communicate with deeply submerged submarines. It was used between 1985 and 2004 but is now decommissioned.

== Geography ==
Clam Lake is located at 46°8′6″N 90°34′43″W (46.164, -90.902).

=== Climate ===
Climate data for Clam Lake 4W, Wisconsin, 1991–2020 normals: 1498ft (457m)
Month	Jan	Feb	Mar	Apr	May	Jun	Jul	Aug	Sep	Oct	Nov	Dec	Year
Record high °F (°C)	47 (8)	58 (14)	76 (24)	77 (25)	90 (32)	91 (33)	92 (33)	90 (32)	85 (29)	81 (27)	72 (22)	52 (11)	92 (33)
Mean maximum °F (°C)	37.8 (3.2)	43.9 (6.6)	58.0 (14.4)	69.5 (20.8)	82.3 (27.9)	86.3 (30.2)	86.9 (30.5)	84.5 (29.2)	81.5 (27.5)	72.5 (22.5)	58.7 (14.8)	43.2 (6.2)	88.5 (31.4)
Mean daily maximum °F (°C)	19.6 (−6.9)	24.8 (−4.0)	36.4 (2.4)	49.2 (9.6)	63.3 (17.4)	72.9 (22.7)	76.4 (24.7)	74.6 (23.7)	66.9 (19.4)	52.5 (11.4)	37.2 (2.9)	24.9 (−3.9)	49.9 (10.0)
Daily mean °F (°C)	10.1 (−12.2)	12.9 (−10.6)	24.6 (−4.1)	38.3 (3.5)	51.7 (10.9)	61.9 (16.6)	66.2 (19.0)	64.1 (17.8)	56.3 (13.5)	43.1 (6.2)	29.5 (−1.4)	16.6 (−8.6)	39.6 (4.2)
Mean daily minimum °F (°C)	0.7 (−17.4)	1.1 (−17.2)	12.8 (−10.7)	27.4 (−2.6)	40.1 (4.5)	51.0 (10.6)	56.0 (13.3)	53.6 (12.0)	45.7 (7.6)	33.7 (0.9)	21.9 (−5.6)	8.2 (−13.2)	29.3 (−1.5)
Mean minimum °F (°C)	−26.6 (−32.6)	−23.0 (−30.6)	−13.1 (−25.1)	11.0 (−11.7)	27.6 (−2.4)	36.6 (2.6)	46.6 (8.1)	42.9 (6.1)	32.2 (0.1)	21.8 (−5.7)	4.4 (−15.3)	−17.2 (−27.3)	−28.2 (−33.4)
Record low °F (°C)	−37 (−38)	−38 (−39)	−30 (−34)	−5 (−21)	23 (−5)	34 (1)	42 (6)	39 (4)	27 (−3)	8 (−13)	−13 (−25)	−32 (−36)	−38 (−39)
Average precipitation inches (mm)	0.99 (25)	0.94 (24)	1.91 (49)	3.12 (79)	4.08 (104)	4.19 (106)	3.96 (101)	4.27 (108)	3.64 (92)	3.37 (86)	2.01 (51)	1.44 (37)	33.92 (862)
Average snowfall inches (cm)	14.4 (37)	14.7 (37)	9.6 (24)	13.8 (35)	2.0 (5.1)	0.0 (0.0)	0.0 (0.0)	0.0 (0.0)	0.2 (0.51)	2.8 (7.1)	9.6 (24)	21.1 (54)	88.2 (223.71)
Source 1: NOAA
Source 2: XMACIS (2008-2020 snowfall, records & monthly max/mins)
