= Extremely low frequency =

3-30 Hz range of the electromagnetic spectrum

- Frequency range: 3 to 30 Hz
- Wavelength range: 100,000 to 10,000 km, respectively

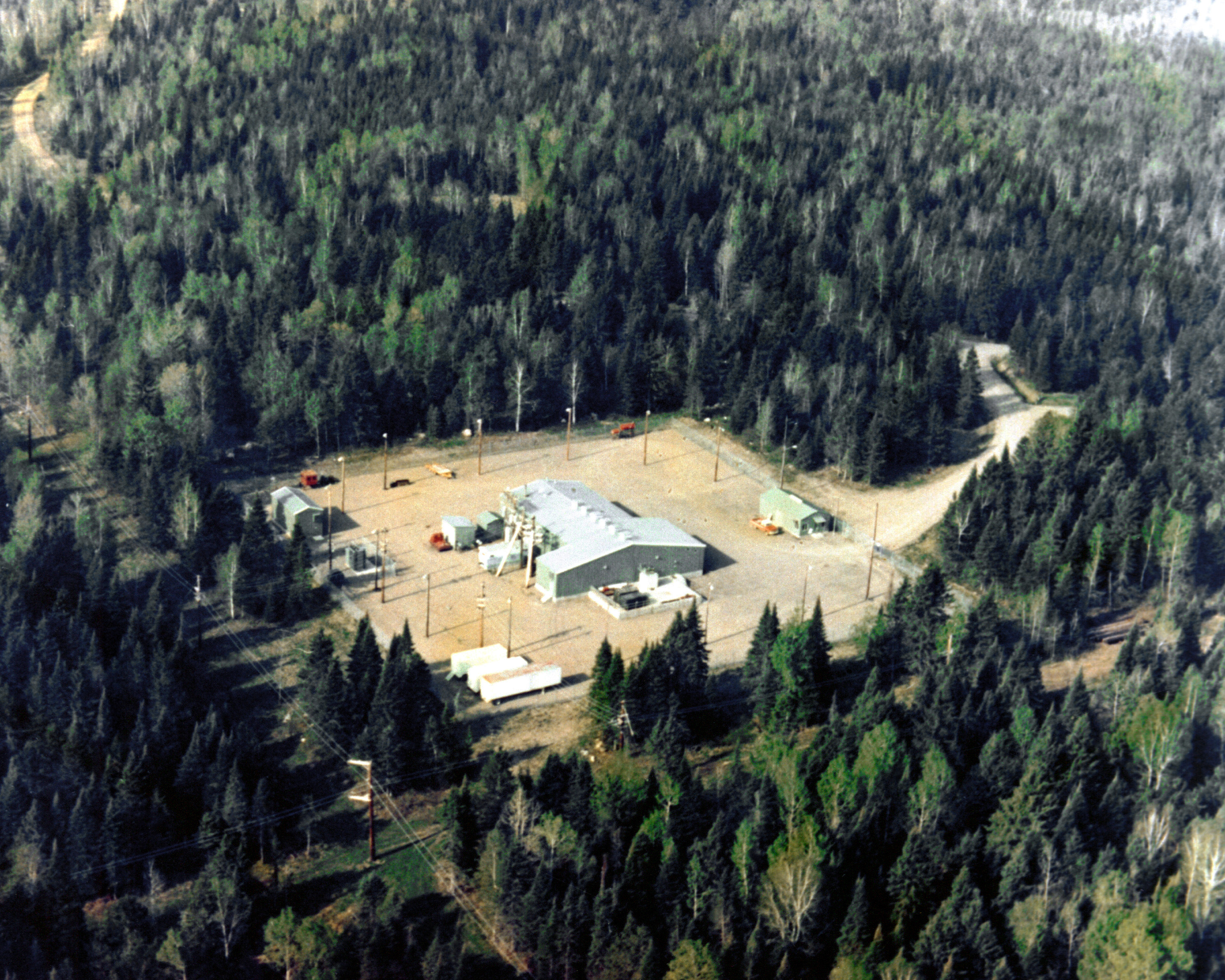
1982 aerial view of the U.S. Navy Clam Lake, Wisconsin, ELF transmitter facility, used to communicate with deeply submerged submarines. The rights of way of the two perpendicular 14 mile (23 km) overhead transmission lines, which constituted the ground dipole antenna, and which radiated the ELF waves, can be seen at the lower left.

Extremely low frequency (ELF) is the ITU designation for electromagnetic radiation (radio waves) with frequencies from 3 to 30 Hz, and corresponding wavelengths of 100,000 to 10,000 kilometers, respectively. In atmospheric science, an alternative definition is usually given, from 3 Hz to 3 kHz. In the related magnetosphere science, the lower-frequency electromagnetic oscillations (pulsations which occur below ~3 kHz) are considered to lie in the ULF range, which is thus also defined differently from the ITU radio bands.

ELF radio waves are generated by lightning and by natural disturbances in Earth's magnetic field, so they are a subject of research by atmospheric scientists. Because of the difficulty of building antennas that can radiate such long waves, ELF waves have been used in only very few human-made communication systems. ELF waves can penetrate seawater, which makes them useful in communication with submarines, and a few nations have built military ELF transmitters to transmit signals to their submerged submarines. Those transmitters consist of huge grounded wire antennas (ground dipoles) that are 15–60 km (9–37 mi) long, and are driven by megawatts of power. The United States, Russia, India, and China are the only countries that are known to have constructed these ELF communication facilities. The U.S. facilities were used between 1985 and 2004, but are now decommissioned.

== Alternative definitions ==
ELF is a subradio frequency. Some medical peer reviewed journal articles refer to ELF in the context of "extremely low frequency (ELF) magnetic fields (MF)" with frequencies of 50 Hz and 50–80 Hz. United States Government agencies, such as NASA, describe ELF as non-ionizing radiation with frequencies between 0 and 300 Hz. The World Health Organization (WHO) have used ELF to refer to the concept of "extremely low frequency (ELF) electric and magnetic fields (EMF)".

== Propagation ==
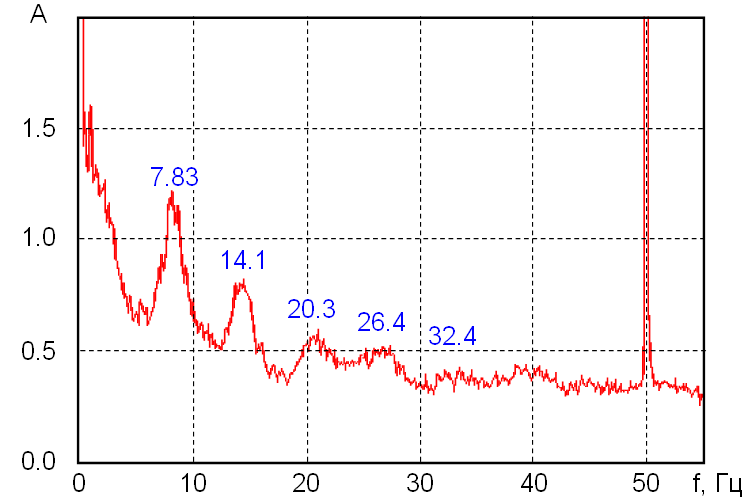
A typical spectrum of ELF electromagnetic waves in Earth's atmosphere, showing peaks that are caused by the Schumann resonances. The Schumann resonances are the resonant frequencies of the spherical ground–ionosphere cavity. Lightning strikes cause the cavity to "ring" like a bell, causing peaks in the noise spectrum. The sharp power peak at 50 Hz is caused by radiation from global electric power grids. The rise of the noise at low frequencies (left side) is radio noise that is caused by slow processes in Earth's magnetosphere.

Due to their extremely long wavelength, ELF waves can diffract around large obstacles, are not blocked by mountain ranges or the horizon, and can travel around the curvature of the world. ELF and VLF waves propagate long distances via a ground–ionosphere waveguide mechanism. Earth is surrounded by a layer of charged particles (ions and electrons) in the atmosphere at an altitude of about 60 km (37 mi) at the bottom of the ionosphere, called the D layer, which reflects ELF waves. The space between the conductive Earth's surface and the conductive D layer acts as a parallel-plate waveguide which confines ELF waves, allowing them to propagate long distances without escaping into space. In contrast to VLF waves, the height of the layer is much less than one wavelength at ELF frequencies, so the only mode that can propagate at ELF frequencies is the transverse electromagnetic mode (TEM) in vertical polarization, with the electric field vertical and the magnetic field horizontal. ELF waves have extremely low attenuation of 1–2 dB per 1,000 km (620 mi), giving a single transmitter the potential to communicate worldwide.

ELF waves can also travel considerable distances through "lossy" media like earth and seawater, which would absorb or reflect higher-frequency radio waves.

=== Schumann resonances ===
The attenuation of ELF waves is so low that they can travel completely around the world several times before decaying to negligible amplitude, and thus waves that are radiated from sources in opposite directions circumnavigating the world on a great circle path interfere with each other. At certain frequencies, these oppositely directed waves are in phase and add (reinforce), causing standing waves. In other words, the closed spherical ground–ionosphere cavity acts as a huge cavity resonator, enhancing ELF radiation at its resonant frequencies. These are called Schumann resonances, after the German physicist Winfried Otto Schumann, who predicted them in 1952, and were detected in the 1950s. Modelling the ground–ionosphere cavity with perfectly conducting walls, Schumann calculated that the resonances should occur at frequencies of

$$f_n = 7.49 \sqrt{n(n + 1)}\ \text{Hz}.$$

The actual frequencies differ slightly from this, due to the conduction properties of the ionosphere. The fundamental Schumann resonance is at approximately 7.83 Hz, the frequency at which the wavelength equals the circumference of Earth, and higher harmonics occur at 14.1, 20.3, 26.4, and 32.4 Hz, etc. Lightning strikes excite these resonances, causing the ground–ionosphere cavity to "ring" like a bell, resulting in a peak in the noise spectrum at these frequencies, so the Schumann resonances can be used to monitor global thunderstorm activity.

Interest in Schumann resonances was renewed in 1993 when E. R. Williams showed a correlation between the resonance frequency and tropical air temperatures, suggesting that the resonance could be used to monitor global warming.

== Submarine communications ==
A ground dipole antenna used for transmitting ELF waves, similar to the U.S. Navy Clam Lake antennas, showing how it works. It functions as a huge loop antenna, with the alternating current I from the transmitter P passing through an overhead transmission line, then deep in the earth from one ground connection G to the other, then through another transmission line back to the transmitter. This creates an alternating magnetic field H, which radiates ELF waves. The alternating current is shown flowing in one direction only through the loop for clarity.

Since ELF radio waves can penetrate seawater deeply, to the operating depths of submarines, a few nations have built naval ELF transmitters to communicate with their submarines while submerged. It was reported in 2018 that China had constructed the world's largest ELF facility roughly the size of New York City in order to communicate with its submarine forces without requiring them to surface. The United States Navy in 1982 built the first ELF submarine communications facility, two coupled ELF transmitters at Clam Lake, Wisconsin, and Republic, Michigan. They were shut down in 2004. The Russian Navy operates an ELF transmitter called ZEVS (Zeus) at Murmansk on the Kola Peninsula. The Indian Navy has an ELF communication facility at the INS Kattabomman naval base to communicate with its Arihant-class and Akula-class submarines.

=== Explanation ===
Because of its electrical conductivity, seawater shields submarines from most higher-frequency radio waves, making radio communication with submerged submarines at ordinary frequencies impossible. Signals in the ELF frequency range, however, can penetrate much deeper. Two factors limit the usefulness of ELF communications channels: the low data transmission rate of a few characters per minute and, to a lesser extent, the one-way nature due to the impracticality of installing an antenna of the required size on a submarine (the antenna needs to be of an exceptional size in order to achieve successful communication). Generally, ELF signals have been used to order a submarine to rise to a shallow depth where it could receive some other form of communication.

=== Difficulties of ELF communication ===
One of the difficulties that is posed when broadcasting in the ELF frequency range is antenna size, because the length of the antenna must be at least a substantial fraction of the length of the waves. For example, a 3 Hz signal has a wavelength that is equal to the distance that electromagnetic waves travel through a given medium in one third of a second. When the refractive index of the medium is greater than one, ELF waves propagate slower than the speed of light in vacuum. As used in military applications, the wavelength is 299,792 km (186,282 mi) per second divided by 50–85 Hz, which equals around 3,500–6,000 km (2,200–3,700 mi) long. This is comparable to Earth's diameter of around 12,742 km (7,918 mi). Because of this huge size requirement, to transmit internationally using ELF frequencies, the world itself forms a significant part of the antenna, and extremely long leads into the ground are necessary. Various means, such as electrical lengthening, are used to construct practical radio stations with smaller sizes.

The United States maintained two sites: in the Chequamegon-Nicolet National Forest, Wisconsin, and in the Escanaba River State Forest, Michigan (originally named Project Sanguine, then downsized and renamed Project ELF prior to construction), until they were dismantled, beginning in late September 2004. Both sites used long power lines, so-called ground dipoles, as leads. These leads were in multiple strands ranging from 22.5 to 45 kilometres (14.0 to 28.0 mi) long. Because of the inefficiency of this method, considerable amounts of electrical power were required to operate the system.

== Other uses ==
Transmitters in the 22 Hz range are also used in pipeline maintenance, or pigging. The signal is generated as an alternating magnetic field, and the transmitter is mounted onto, or onto part of, the "pig", which is the cleaning device that is inserted into the pipe. The pig is pushed through a mostly metal pipeline. The ELF signal can be detected through the metal, allowing its location to be detected by receivers that are located outside of the pipe. It is used to check whether a pig has passed a certain location, or to locate a stuck pig.

Some radio hobbyists record ELF signals using antennas ranging in size from 18-inch active antennas up to several thousand feet in length taking advantage of fences, highway guard rails, and even decommissioned railroad tracks. They then replay them at higher speeds to more easily observe natural low-frequency fluctuations in Earth's electromagnetic field. Increasing the playback speed increases the pitch, bringing the tone into the audio frequency range.

Since the 2000s, very low frequencies have been used successfully at sea for oil geophysical prospecting.

== Natural sources ==
Naturally occurring ELF waves are present on Earth, resonating in the region between the ionosphere and the surface, seen in lightning strikes that make electrons in the atmosphere oscillate. Although signals that are generated from lightning discharges were predominantly VLF, it was found that an observable ELF component (slow tail) followed the VLF component in almost all cases. Also, the fundamental mode of the ground–ionosphere cavity has the wavelength equal to the circumference of Earth, which gives a resonance frequency of 7.8 Hz. This frequency, and higher resonance modes of 14, 20, 26, and 32 Hz, appear as peaks in the ELF spectrum, and are called Schumann resonance.

ELF waves have also been tentatively identified on Saturn's moon Titan. Titan's surface is thought to be a poor reflector of ELF waves, so the waves may instead be reflecting from the liquid–ice boundary of a subsurface ocean of water and ammonia, the existence of which is predicted by some theoretical models. Titan's ionosphere is also more complex than Earth's, with the main ionosphere at an altitude of 1,200 km (750 mi), but with an additional layer of charged particles at 63 km (39 mi). This splits Titan's atmosphere into two separate resonating chambers. The source of natural ELF waves on Titan is unclear, as there does not appear to be extensive lightning activity.

Huge ELF radiation power outputs of 100,000 times the sun's output in visible light may be radiated by magnetars. The pulsar in the Crab nebula radiates powers of this order at 30 Hz. Radiation of this frequency is below the plasma frequency of the interstellar medium, thus this medium is opaque to it, and it cannot be observed from Earth.

== Exposure ==
In electromagnetic therapy and electromagnetic radiation and health research, electromagnetic spectrum frequencies between 0 and 100 Hertz are considered extremely low-frequency fields. A common source of exposure of the public to ELF fields is 50 or 60 Hz electric and magnetic fields from high-voltage electric power transmission lines and secondary distribution lines, such as those supplying electricity to residential neighborhoods.

=== Leukemia allegations ===
There is high uncertainty regarding correlations between long-term, low-level exposure to ELF fields and a number of health effects, including leukemia in children. In October 2005, WHO convened a task group of scientific experts to assess any risks to health that might exist from "exposure to ELF electric and magnetic fields in the frequency range >0 to 100,000 Hz (100 kHz) in regards to childhood leukemia". The long-term, low-level exposure is evaluated as average exposure to residential power-frequency magnetic field above 0.3–0.4 μT, and it is estimated that only between 1% and 4% of children live in such conditions. Subsequently, in 2010, a pooled analysis of epidemiological evidence supported the hypothesis that exposure to power-frequency magnetic fields is related to childhood leukemia.

No other study has found any evidence to support the hypothesis that ELF exposure is a contributing factor to leukemia in children.

A 2014 study estimated the cases of childhood leukemia attributable to exposure to ELF magnetic fields in the European Union (EU27), assuming that correlations seen in epidemiological studies were causal. It reported that around 50–60 cases of childhood leukemia might be attributable to ELF magnetic fields annually, corresponding to between ~1.5% and ~2.0% of all incident cases of childhood leukemia occurring in the EU27 each year. At present, however, ICNIRP and IEEE consider the scientific evidence related to possible health effects from long-term, low-level exposure to ELF fields insufficient to justify lowering these quantitative exposure limits. In summary, when all of the studies are evaluated together, the evidence suggesting that EMFs may contribute to an increased risk of cancer is non-existent. Epidemiological studies suggest a possible association between long-term occupational exposure to ELF and Alzheimer's disease.

=== Ecological impact ===
There have been some concerns over the possible ecological impact of ELF signals. In 1984 a federal judge halted construction of Project ELF, requiring more environmental and health studies. This judgment was overruled by a federal appeals court on the basis that the US Navy claimed to have spent over $25 million studying the effects of the electromagnetic fields, with results indicating that they were similar to the effect produced by standard power-distribution lines. However, during the time that ELF was in use, some Wisconsin politicians, such as Democratic Senators Herb Kohl, Russ Feingold and Congressman Dave Obey, continued to call for its closure.

Extremely low frequency (ELF) electromagnetic fields (EMFs), typically ranging from 0.3 Hz to 300 Hz, have various ecological impacts on both flora and fauna.

=== Conspiracy theories ===
Since the late 1970s, various conspiracy theories have risen around exposure to ELF electric and magnetic fields (EMF). According to a review by the World Health Organization (WHO), external ELF magnetic fields induce electric fields and currents in the body, which, at very high field strengths, may cause nerve and muscle stimulation and changes in nerve cell excitability in the central nervous system.

ELF at human-perceivable kV/m levels was said to create an annoying tingling sensation in the areas of the body in contact with clothing, particularly the arms, due to the induction of a surface charge by the ELF. Of the volunteers of WHO scientific study, 7% described the spark discharges as painful when the subject was well-insulated and touched a grounded object within a 5 kV/m field, whereas 50% described a similar spark discharge as painful in a 10 kV/m field.

== Patents ==
- Tanner, R. L., U.S. patent 3,215,937, "Extremely low-frequency antenna", 1965
- Hansell, Clarence W., U.S. patent 2,389,432, "Communication system by pulses through the Earth"
- Altshuler, U.S. patent 4,051,479, ELF vertical dipole antenna suspended from aircraft

== See also ==
- Ultra low frequency
- Infrasound
- Skin effect
- TACAMO
- Wardenclyffe Tower
- Naval Communication Station Harold E. Holt
- Magnetic pulsations
