= INS Kattabomman =

Indian Navy transmission facility

Coordinates: 8.3870°N 77.7529°E

- Tirunelveli, Tamil Nadu
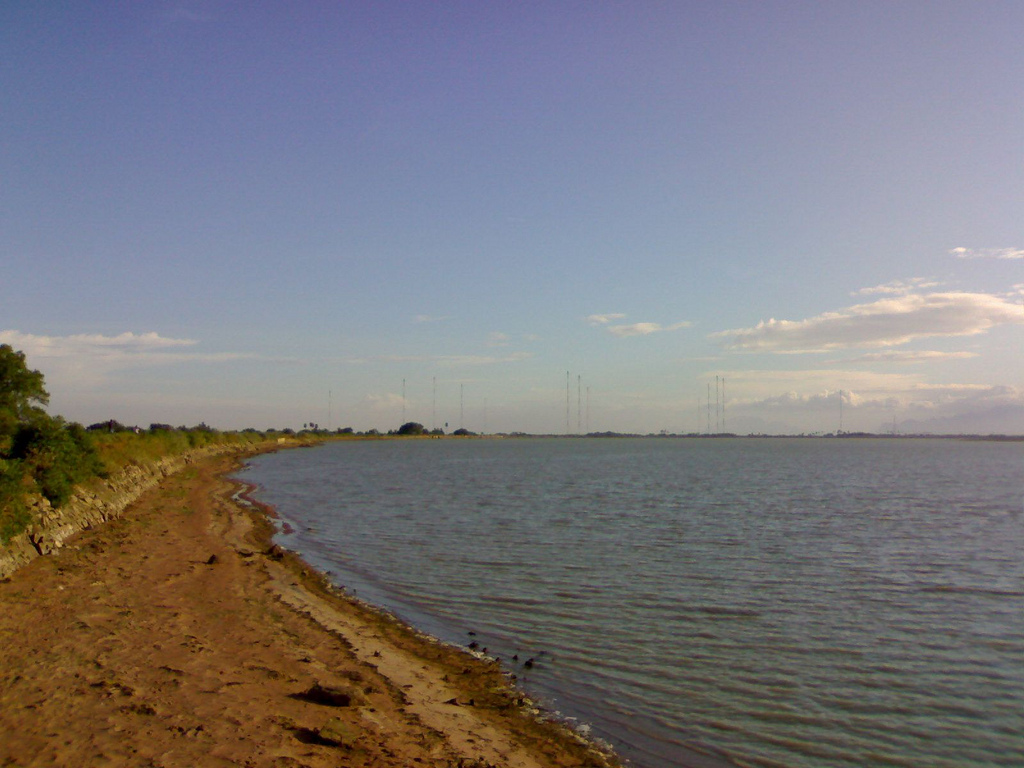
- INS Kattabomman, VLF transmitting station of Indian Navy

Site information
- Type: Naval station
- Controlled by: Indian Navy

Site history
- Built: 1990
- In use: 1990–present

Garrison information
- Occupants: Southern Naval Command

INS Kattabomman is the designation of the VLF-transmission facility of the Indian Navy situated at Vijayanarayanam near Tirunelveli in Tamil Nadu. The facility spread over 3,000 acres has 13 masts, which are arranged in two rings around the central mast. The centre mast has a height of 301 metres, the masts on the inner ring measure 276.4 metres, that on the outer ring measure 227.4 metres. The facility broadcasts at frequencies of 16.3 kHz, 17.0 kHz, 18.2 kHz, and 19.2 kHz.

Two further masts of the station carrying an umbrella antenna, the INS Kattabomman is 471 metres tall and the tallest structure in India. They are also the tallest military structure in the world. The facility opened an ELF transmission facility in 2014.

== History ==
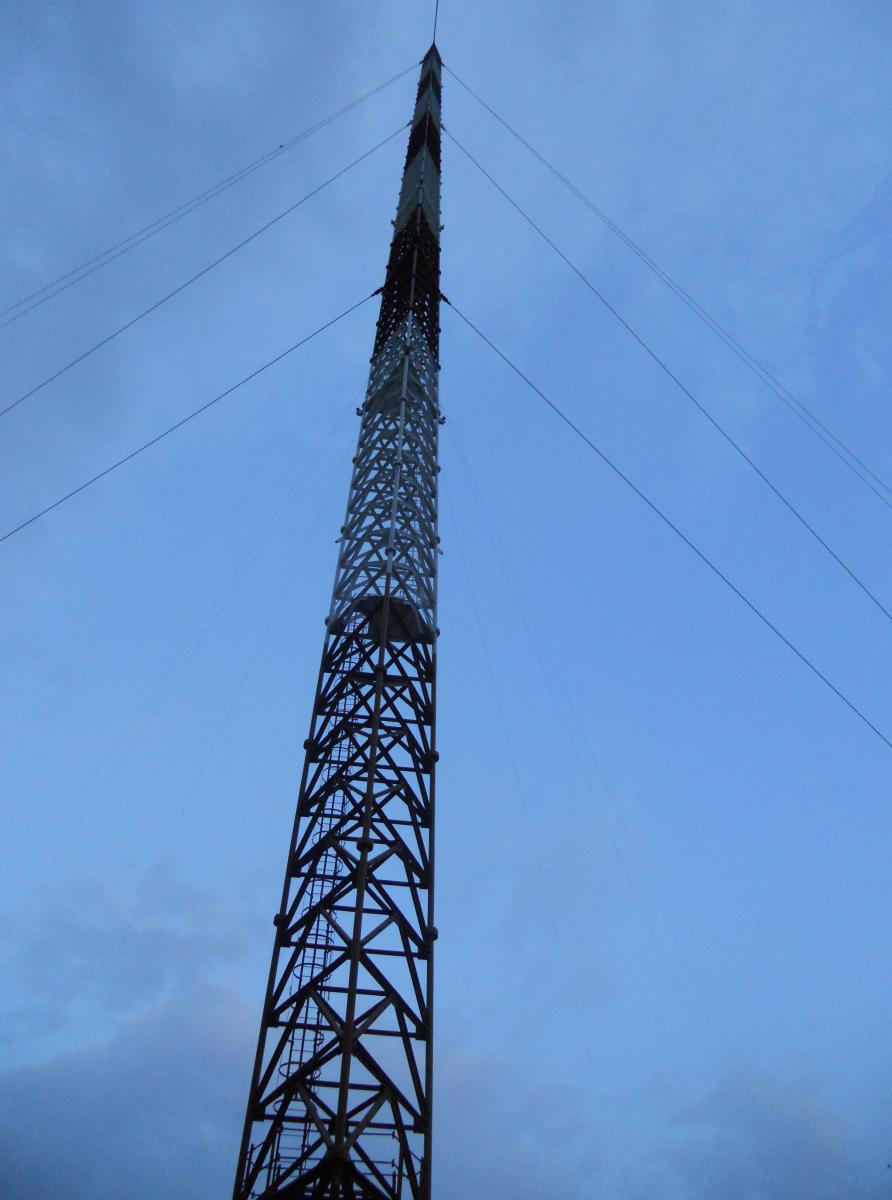
One of the Antennas at INS Kattabomman.

Development and construction of INS Kattabomman started in 1984 as Project Skylark and costed ₹122 crore (equivalent to ₹11 billion or US$120 million in 2026). It was commissioned into service by Indian President Ramaswamy Venkataraman on 20 October 1990. It is named after king Veera Pandya Kattabomman, who died during the Indian independence movement.

After operationalising the base, India became the seventh country in the world to have developed the VLF communication capability.

== Further development ==
=== VLF upgrades ===
On 31 July 2014, a new VLF facility was inaugurated at INS Kattabomman. The upgrade was contracted to Larsen & Toubro. The upgrade included digitising the control interface.

=== Extremely low frequency facility ===
An Extremely low frequency (ELF) communication facility is also present near the VLF facility, the construction of which commenced in March 2012. The facility is used by the Nuclear Command Authority to communicate with the Arihant-class submarines.

India is the second country after Russia to actively operate an Extremely low frequency facility; the United States had discontinued using it in 2004. Another such facility is proposed in Damagundam Reserve Forest (approximately at 17°16'N 77°56'E ). This 2nd facility had the foundation stone laid on 15 October 2024, with a plan to be operational by 2027.

== See also ==
Indian navy

- List of Indian Navy bases
- List of active Indian Navy ships

Integrated commands and units

- Armed Forces Special Operations Division
- Defence Cyber Agency
- Integrated Defence Staff
- Integrated Space Cell
- Indian Nuclear Command Authority
- Indian Armed Forces
- Special Forces of India

Other topics

- Strategic Forces Command
- List of Indian Air Force stations
- List of Indian Navy bases
- India's overseas military bases
- Veerapandiya Kattabomman
