= Lualualei VLF transmitter =

VLF radio transmitter

VLF transmitter Lualualei, Mast 1
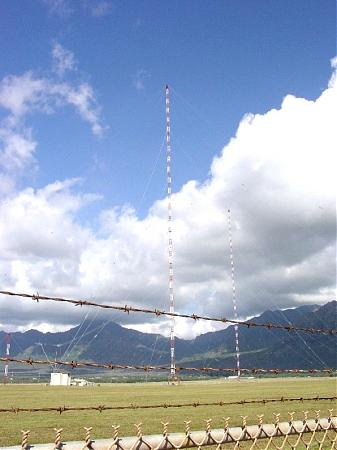
- Interactive map of the VLF transmitter Lualualei, Mast 1 area

General information
- Status: Completed
- Type: Mast radiator insulated against ground
- Location: Lualualei, Hawaii, United States
- Coordinates: 21°25′13.38″N 158°09′14.35″W
- Completed: 1972

Height
- Height: 458.11 m (1,503.0 ft)

Design and construction
- Main contractor: US Navy

VLF transmitter Lualualei, Mast 2
- Interactive map of the VLF transmitter Lualualei, Mast 2 area

General information
- Status: Completed
- Type: Mast radiator insulated against ground
- Location: Lualualei, Hawaii, United States
- Coordinates: 21°25′11.87″N 158°08′53.67″W
- Completed: 1972

Height
- Height: 458.11 m (1,503.0 ft)

Design and construction
- Main contractor: US Navy

VLF transmitter Lualualei is a facility of the United States Navy near Lualualei, Hawaii transmitting orders to submerged submarines in the very low frequency (VLF) range.

== Description ==
VLF transmitter Lualualei operates under the callsign NPM on 21.4 kHz and 23.4 kHz.

The station's antenna was built in 1972; it consists of two guyed masts, each 458.11 metres (1503 feet) tall, which are configured as umbrella antennas. They are fed by an overhead cable, fixed to a tall mast at one end, and at the opposite end to a smaller grounded mast near the helix building via an insulator.

At the time they were built, these were the tallest towers used for military purposes in the Western hemisphere. They are also the tallest towers used for long wave transmissions in the Western hemisphere. Since the collapse of the Warsaw Radio Mast, they may be the world's tallest structures that are electrically insulated from the ground.

== See also ==
- VLF Transmitter Cutler
- Jim Creek Naval Radio Station
- Naval Communication Station Harold E. Holt
- List of masts
