= Very low frequency =

3–30 kHz range of the electromagnetic spectrum

- Frequency range: 3–30 kHz
- Wavelength range: 100-10 km

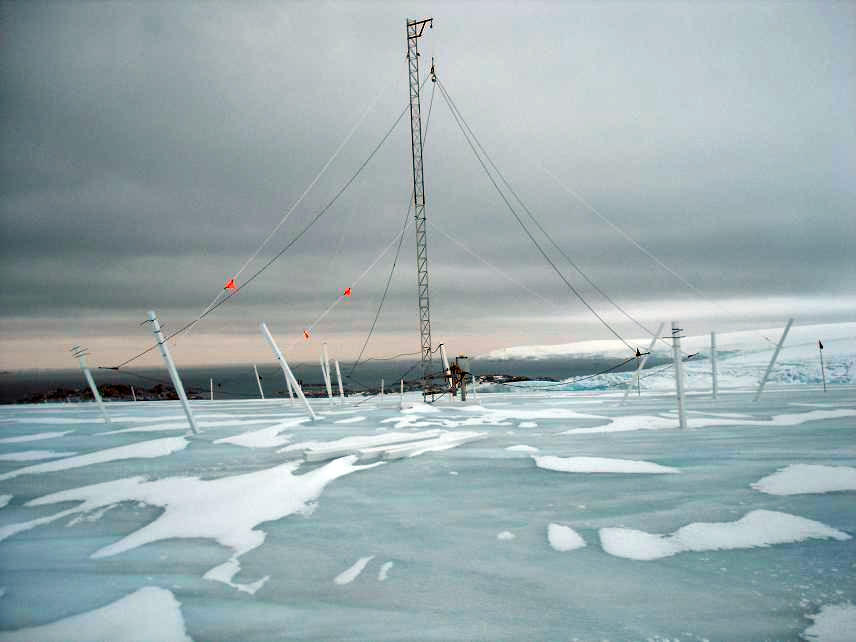
A VLF receiving antenna at Palmer Station, Antarctica, operated by Stanford University

Very low frequency or VLF is the ITU designation for radio frequencies (RF) in the range of 3–30 kHz, corresponding to wavelengths from 100 to 10 km, respectively. The band is also known as the myriameter band or myriameter wave as the wavelengths range from one to ten myriameters (an obsolete metric unit equal to 10 kilometers). Due to its limited bandwidth, audio (voice) transmission is highly impractical in this band, and therefore only low-data-rate coded signals are used. The VLF band is used for a few radio navigation services, government time radio stations (broadcasting time signals to set radio clocks) and secure military communication. Since VLF waves can penetrate at least 40 meters (130 ft) into saltwater, they are used for military communication with submarines.

== Propagation characteristics ==
Because of their long wavelengths, VLF radio waves can diffract around large obstacles and so are not blocked by mountain ranges, and they can propagate as ground waves following the curvature of the Earth and so are not limited by the horizon. Ground waves are absorbed by the resistance of the Earth and are less important beyond several hundred to a thousand kilometres/miles, and the main mode of long-distance propagation is an Earth–ionosphere waveguide mechanism. The Earth is surrounded by a conductive layer of electrons and ions in the upper atmosphere at the bottom of the ionosphere called the D layer at 60–90 km (37–56 mi) altitude, which reflects VLF radio waves. The conductive ionosphere and the conductive Earth form a horizontal "duct" a few VLF wavelengths high, which acts as a waveguide confining the waves so they don't escape into space. The waves travel in a zig-zag path around the Earth, reflected alternately by the Earth and the ionosphere, in transverse magnetic (TM) mode.

VLF waves have very low path attenuation, 2–3 dB per 1,000 km, with little of the "fading" experienced at higher frequencies. This is because VLF waves are reflected from the bottom of the ionosphere, while higher frequency shortwave signals are returned to Earth from higher layers in the ionosphere, the F1 and F2 layers, by a refraction process, and spend most of their journey in the ionosphere, so they are much more affected by ionization gradients and turbulence. Therefore, VLF transmissions are very stable and reliable, and are used for long-distance communication. Propagation distances of 5,000–20,000 km have been realized. However, atmospheric noise ("sferics") is high in the band, including such phenomena as "whistlers", caused by lightning.

- VLF waves can penetrate seawater to a depth of at least 10–40 meters (33–131 feet), depending on the frequency employed and the salinity of the water, so they are used to communicate with submarines.
- VLF waves at certain frequencies have been found to cause electron precipitation.
- VLF waves used to communicate with submarines have created an artificial bubble around the Earth that can protect it from solar flares and coronal mass ejections; this occurred through interaction with high-energy radiation particles.

== Antennas ==
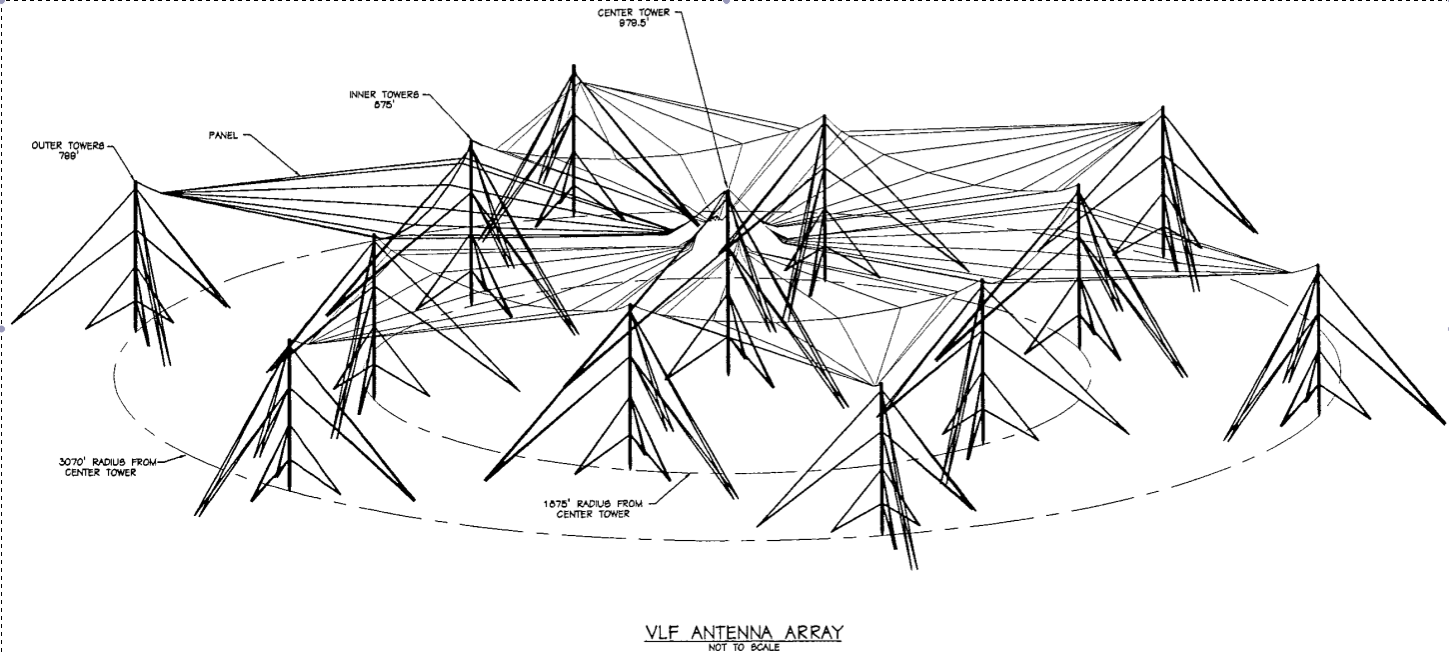
"Trideco" antenna tower array at the US Navy's Naval Radio Station Cutler in Cutler, Maine, USA. The central mast is the radiating element, while the star-shaped horizontal wire array is the capacitive top load. About 2 km (1.2 mi) in diameter, it communicates with submerged submarines at 24 kHz (12,500 meter wavelength) at a power of 1.8 megawatts, one of the most powerful radio stations in the world.

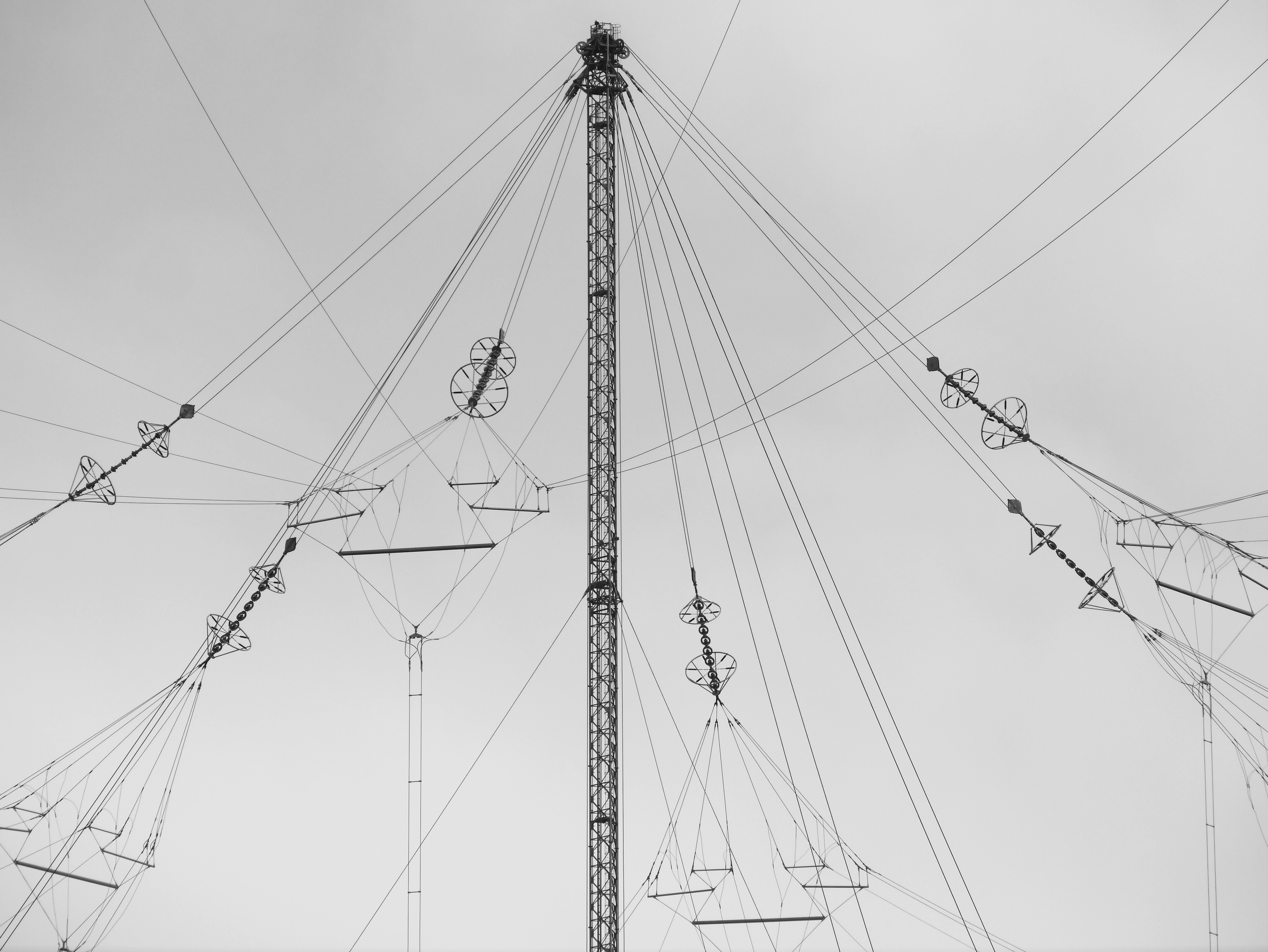
Central mast of a similar "trideco" antenna of the NATO VLF transmitter at Anthorn radio station, UK, showing six insulator strings attaching the toploads to the six vertical radiator wires

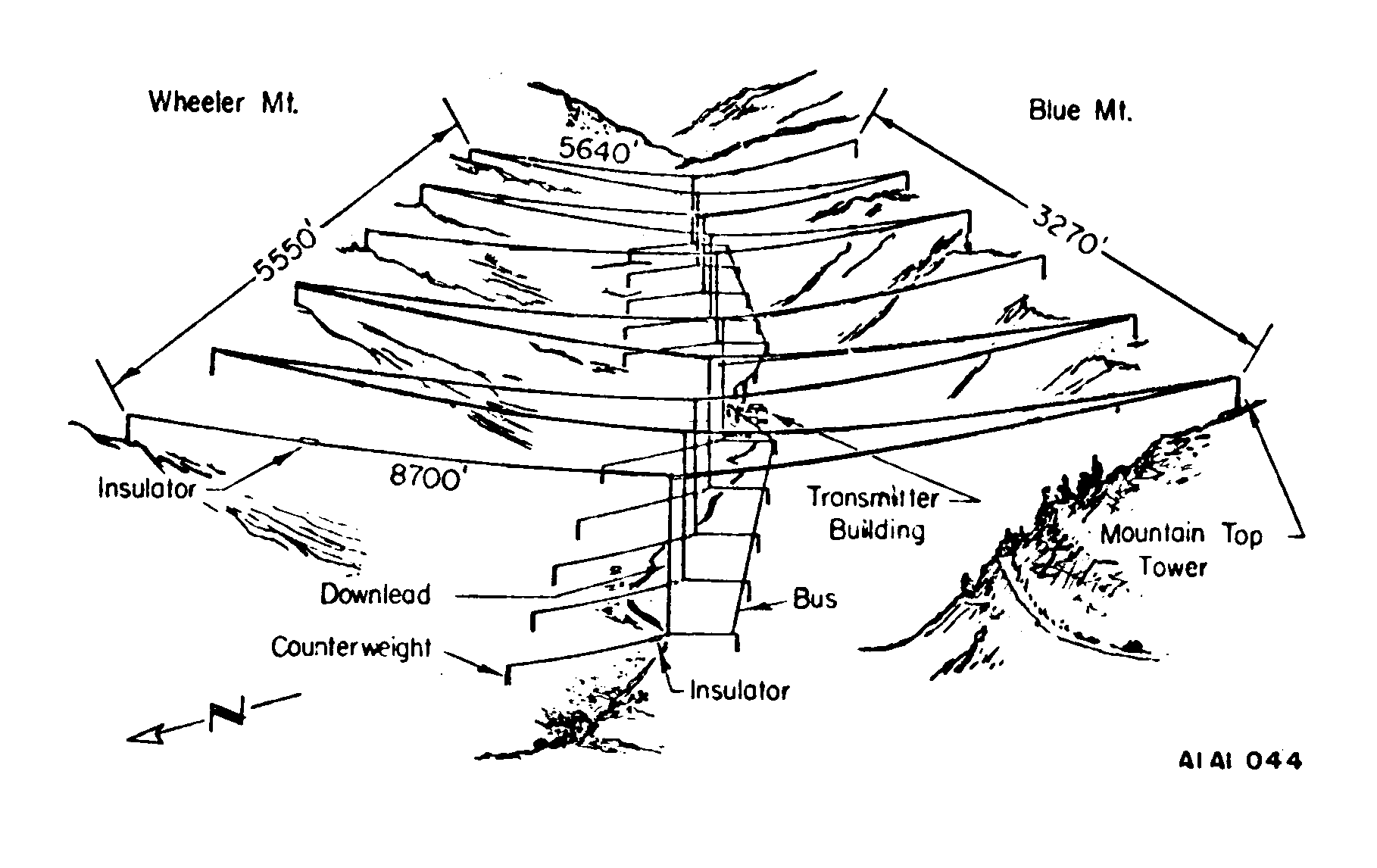
Another type of large VLF antenna: the "valley-span" antenna, consisting of one or more long horizontal topload cables spanning a valley, fed in the center by vertical radiator cables. This example is at the US Navy Jim Creek station near Seattle, which transmits on 24.8 kHz at a power of 1.2 MW.

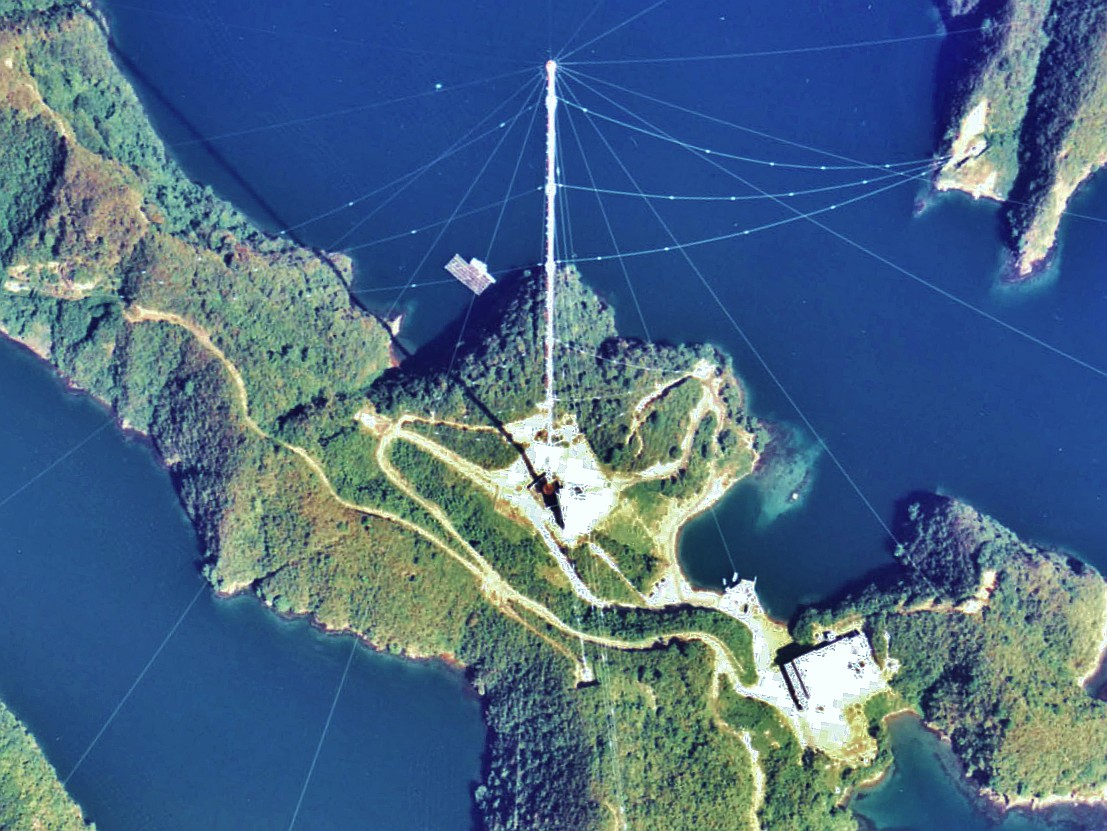
Umbrella antenna of the Omega navigation system beacon on Tsushima Island, Japan, which transmitted at 10–14 kHz; 389 meters high, it was dismantled in 1998.

A major practical drawback of the VLF band is that because of the length of the waves, full size resonant antennas (half wave dipole or quarter wave monopole antennas) cannot be built because of their physical height. Vertical antennas must be used because VLF waves propagate in vertical polarization, but a quarter-wave vertical antenna at 30 kHz (10 km wavelength) would be 2.5 kilometres (8,200 feet) high. So practical transmitting antennas are electrically short, a small fraction of the length at which they would be self-resonant. Due to their low radiation resistance (often less than one ohm) they are inefficient, radiating only 10% to 50% of the transmitter power at most, with the rest of the power dissipated in the antenna/ground system resistances. Very high power transmitters (~1 megawatt) are required for long-distance communication, so the efficiency of the antenna is an important factor.

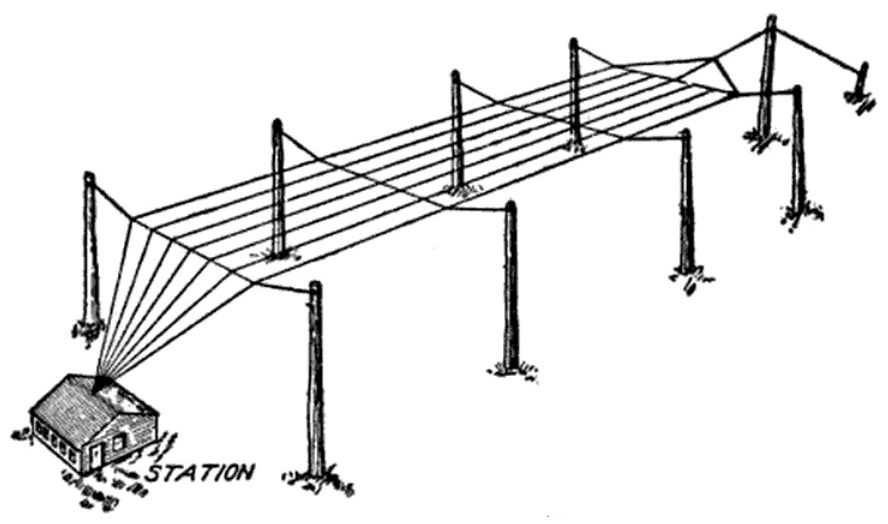
A "triatic" or "flattop" antenna, another common VLF transmitting antenna. It consists of vertical radiator wires each connected at top to parallel horizontal capacitive topload wires stretching up to a kilometer, supported on tall towers. The transverse support cables suspending the horizontal wires are called "triatics".

=== VLF transmitting antennas ===
High power VLF transmitting stations use capacitively-toploaded monopole antennas. These are very large wire antennas, up to several kilometers long. They consist of a series of steel radio masts, linked at the top with a network of cables, often shaped like an umbrella or clotheslines. Either the towers themselves or vertical wires serve as monopole radiators, and the horizontal cables form a capacitive top-load to increase the current in the vertical wires, increasing the radiated power and efficiency of the antenna. High-power stations use variations on the umbrella antenna such as the "delta" and "trideco" antennas, or multiwire flattop (triatic) antennas. For low-power transmitters, inverted-L and T antennas are used.

Due to the low radiation resistance, to minimize power dissipated in the ground these antennas require extremely low resistance ground (Earthing) systems, consisting of radial networks of buried copper wires under the antenna. To minimize dielectric losses in the soil, the ground conductors are buried shallowly, only a few inches in the ground, and the ground surface near the antenna is sometimes protected by copper ground screens. Counterpoise systems have also been used, consisting of radial networks of copper cables supported several feet above the ground under the antenna.

A large loading coil is required at the antenna feed point to cancel the capacitive reactance of the antenna to make it resonant. At VLF the design of this coil is challenging; it must have low resistance at the operating RF frequency, high Q, must handle very high currents, and must withstand the extremely high voltage on the antenna. These are usually huge air core coils 2–4 meters high wound on a nonconductive frame, with RF resistance reduced by using thick litz wire several centimeters in diameter, consisting of thousands of insulated strands of fine wire braided together.

The high capacitance and inductance and low resistance of the antenna-loading coil combination makes it act electrically like a high Q tuned circuit. VLF antennas have very narrow bandwidth and to change the transmitting frequency requires a variable inductor (variometer) to tune the antenna. The large VLF antennas used for high-power transmitters usually have bandwidths of only 50–100 hertz. The high Q results in very high voltages (up to 250 kV) on the antenna and very good insulation is required. Large VLF antennas usually operate in 'voltage limited' mode: the maximum power of the transmitter is limited by the voltage the antenna can accept without air breakdown, corona, and arcing from the antenna.

=== Dynamic antenna tuning ===
The bandwidth of large capacitively loaded VLF antennas is so narrow (50–100 Hz) that even the small frequency shifts of FSK and MSK modulation may exceed it, throwing the antenna out of resonance, causing the antenna to reflect some power back down the feedline. The traditional solution is to use a "bandwidth resistor" in the antenna which reduces the Q, increasing the bandwidth; however this also reduces the power output. A recent alternative used in some military VLF transmitters is a circuit which dynamically shifts the antenna's resonant frequency between the two output frequencies with the modulation. This is accomplished with a saturable reactor in series with the antenna loading coil. This is a ferromagnetic core inductor with a second control winding through which a DC current flows, which controls the inductance by magnetizing the core, changing its permeability. The keying datastream is applied to the control winding. So when the frequency of the transmitter is shifted between the '1' and '0' frequencies, the saturable reactor changes the inductance in the antenna resonant circuit to shift the antenna resonant frequency to follow the transmitter's frequency.

=== VLF receiving antennas ===
The requirements for receiving antennas are less stringent, because of the high level of natural atmospheric noise in the band. At VLF frequencies atmospheric radio noise is far above the receiver noise introduced by the receiver circuit and determines the receiver signal-to-noise ratio. So small inefficient receiving antennas can be used, and the low voltage signal from the antenna can simply be amplified by the receiver without introducing significant noise. Ferrite loop antennas are usually used for reception.

== Modulation ==
Because of the small bandwidth of the band, and the extremely narrow bandwidth of the antennas used, it is impractical to transmit audio signals (AM or FM radiotelephony). A typical AM radio signal with a bandwidth of 10 kHz would occupy one third of the VLF band. More significantly, it would be difficult to transmit any distance because it would require an antenna with 100 times the bandwidth of current VLF antennas, which due to the Chu-Harrington limit would be enormous in size. Therefore, only text data can be transmitted, at low bit rates. In military networks frequency-shift keying (FSK) modulation is used to transmit radioteletype data using 5 bit ITA2 or 8 bit ASCII character codes. A small frequency shift of 30–50 hertz is used due to the small bandwidth of the antenna.

In high power VLF transmitters, to increase the allowable data rate, a special form of FSK called minimum-shift keying (MSK) is used. This is required due to the high Q of the antenna. The huge capacitively-loaded antenna and loading coil form a high Q tuned circuit, which stores oscillating electrical energy. The Q of large VLF antennas is typically over 200; this means the antenna stores far more energy (200 times as much) than is supplied or radiated in any single cycle of the transmitter current. The energy is stored alternately as electrostatic energy in the topload and ground system, and magnetic energy in the vertical wires and loading coil. VLF antennas typically operate "voltage-limited", with the voltage on the antenna close to the limit that the insulation will stand, so they will not tolerate any abrupt change in the voltage or current from the transmitter without arcing or other insulation problems. As described below, MSK is able to modulate the transmitted wave at higher data rates without causing voltage spikes on the antenna.

The three types of modulation that have been used in VLF transmitters are:

Continuous Wave (CW), Interrupted Continuous Wave (ICW), or On-Off Keying
Morse code radiotelegraphy transmission with unmodulated carrier. The carrier is turned on and off, with carrier on representing the Morse code "dots" and "dashes" and carrier off representing spaces. The simplest and earliest form of radio data transmission, this was used from the beginning of the 20th century to the 1960s in commercial and military VLF stations. Because of the high antenna Q the carrier cannot be switched abruptly on and off but requires a long time constant, many cycles, to build up the oscillating energy in the antenna when the carrier turns on, and many cycles to dissipate the stored energy when the carrier turns off. This limits the data rate that can be transmitted to 15–20 words/minute. CW is now only used in small hand-keyed transmitters, and for testing large transmitters.
Frequency-shift keying (FSK)
FSK is the second oldest and second simplest form of digital radio data modulation, after CW. For FSK, the carrier shifted between two frequencies, one representing the binary digit '1' and the other representing binary '0'. For example, a frequency of 9070 Hz might be used to indicate a '1' and the frequency 9020 Hz, 50 Hz lower, to indicate a '0'. The two frequencies are generated by a continuously running frequency synthesizer. The transmitter is periodically switched between these frequencies to represent 8 bit ASCII codes for the characters of the message. A problem at VLF is that when the frequency is switched the two sine waves usually have different phases, which creates a sudden phase-shift transient which can cause arcing on the antenna. To avoid arcing, FSK can only be used at slow rates of 50–75 bit/s.
Minimum-shift keying (MSK)
A continuous phase version of FSK designed specifically for small bandwidths, this was adopted by naval VLF stations in the 1970s to increase the data rate and is now the standard mode used in military VLF transmitters. If the two frequencies representing '1' and '0' are 50 Hz apart, the standard frequency shift used in military VLF stations, their phases coincide every 20 ms. In MSK the frequency of the transmitter is switched only when the two sine waves have the same phase, at the point both sine waves cross zero in the same direction. This creates a smooth continuous transition between the waves, avoiding transients which can cause stress and arcing on the antenna. MSK can be used at data rates up to 300 bit/s, or about 35 ASCII characters (8 bits each) per second, approximately 450 words per minute.

== Applications ==
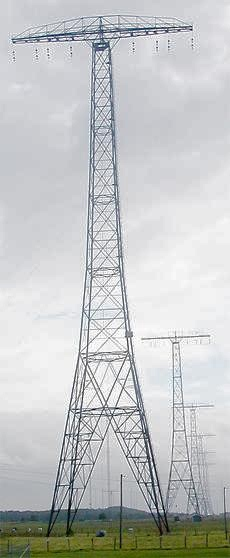
Flattop antenna towers of the Grimeton VLF transmitter, Varberg, Sweden

=== Early wireless telegraphy ===
Historically, this band was used for long distance transoceanic radio communication during the wireless telegraphy era between about 1905 and 1925. Nations built networks of high-power LF and VLF radiotelegraphy stations that transmitted text information by Morse code, to communicate with other countries, their colonies, and naval fleets. Early attempts were made to use radiotelephone using amplitude modulation and single-sideband modulation within the band starting from 20 kHz, but the result was unsatisfactory because the available bandwidth was insufficient to contain the sidebands.

In the 1920s the discovery of the skywave (skip) radio propagation method allowed lower power transmitters operating at high frequency to communicate at similar distances by reflecting their radio waves off a layer of ionized atoms in the ionosphere, and long-distance radio communication stations switched to the shortwave frequencies. The Grimeton VLF transmitter at Grimeton near Varberg in Sweden, one of the few remaining transmitters from that era that has been preserved as a historical monument, can be visited by the public at certain times, such as on Alexanderson Day.

=== Navigation beacons and time signals ===
Due to its long propagation distances and stable phase characteristics, during the 20th century the VLF band was used for long range hyperbolic radio navigation systems which allowed ships and aircraft to determine their geographical position by comparing the phase of radio waves received from fixed VLF navigation beacon transmitters.

The worldwide Omega system used frequencies from 10 to 14 kHz, as did Russia's Alpha.

VLF was also used for standard time and frequency broadcasts. In the US, the time signal station WWVL began transmitting a 500 W signal on 20 kHz in August 1963. It used frequency-shift keying (FSK) to send data, shifting between 20 kHz and 26 kHz. The WWVL service was discontinued in July 1972.

=== Geophysical and atmospheric measurement ===
Naturally occurring signals in the VLF band are used by geophysicists for long range lightning location and for research into atmospheric phenomena such as the aurora. Measurements of whistlers are employed to infer the physical properties of the magnetosphere.

Geophysicists use VLF-electromagnetic receivers to measure conductivity in the near surface of the Earth.

VLF signals can be measured as a geophysical electromagnetic survey that relies on transmitted currents inducing secondary responses in conductive geologic units. A VLF anomaly represents a change in the attitude of the electromagnetic vector overlying conductive materials in the subsurface.

=== Mine communication systems ===
VLF can also penetrate soil and rock for some distance, so these frequencies are also used for through-the-earth mine communications systems.

=== Military communications ===
Powerful VLF transmitters are used by the military to communicate with their forces worldwide. The advantage of VLF frequencies is their long range, high reliability, and the prediction that in a nuclear war VLF communications will be less disrupted by nuclear explosions than higher frequencies. Since it can penetrate seawater VLF is used by the military to communicate with submarines near the surface, while ELF frequencies are used for deeply submerged subs.

Examples of naval VLF transmitters are

- Britain's Skelton Transmitting Station in Skelton, Cumbria
- Germany's DHO38 in Rhauderfehn, which transmits on 23.4 kHz with a power of 800 kW
- U.S. Jim Creek Naval Radio Station in Oso, Washington state, which transmits on 24.8 kHz with a power of 1.2 MW
- U.S. Cutler Naval Radio Station at Cutler, Maine which transmits on 24 kHz with 1.8 MW.

Since 2004 the US Navy has stopped using ELF transmissions, with the statement that improvements in VLF communication has made them unnecessary, so it may have developed technology to allow submarines to receive VLF transmissions while at operating depth.

High power land-based and aircraft transmitters in countries that operate submarines send signals that can be received thousands of miles away. Transmitter sites typically cover great areas (many acres or square kilometers), with transmitted power anywhere from 20 kW to 2,000 kW. Submarines receive signals from land based and aircraft transmitters using some form of towed antenna that floats just under the surface of the water – for example a Buoyant Cable Array Antenna (BCAA).

Modern receivers use sophisticated digital signal processing techniques to remove the effects of atmospheric noise (largely caused by lightning strikes around the world) and adjacent channel signals, extending the useful reception range. Strategic nuclear bombers of the United States Air Force receive VLF signals as part of hardened nuclear resilient operations.

Two alternative character sets may be used: 5 bit ITA2 or 8 bit ASCII. Because these are military transmissions they are almost always encrypted for security reasons. Although it is relatively easy to receive the transmissions and convert them into a string of characters, enemies cannot decode the encrypted messages; military communications usually use unbreakable one-time pad ciphers since the amount of text is so small.

== Amateur use ==
The frequency range below 8.3 kHz is not allocated by the International Telecommunication Union and in some nations may be used license-free. Radio amateurs in some countries have been granted permission (or have assumed permission) to operate at frequencies below 8.3 kHz.

Operations tend to congregate around the frequencies 8.27 kHz, 6.47 kHz, 5.17 kHz, and 2.97 kHz. Transmissions typically last from one hour up to several days and both receiver and transmitter must have their frequency locked to a stable reference such as a GPS-disciplined oscillator or a rubidium standard in order to support such long duration coherent detection and decoding.

=== Amateur equipment ===
Radiated power from amateur stations is very small, ranging from 1 μW to 100 μW for fixed base station antennas, and up to 10 mW from kite or balloon antennas. Despite the low power, stable propagation with low attenuation in the Earth–ionosphere cavity enable very narrow bandwidths to be used to reach distances up to several thousand kilometers. The modes used are QRSS, MFSK, and coherent BPSK.

The transmitter generally consists of an audio amplifier of a few hundred watts, an impedance matching transformer, a loading coil and a large wire antenna. Receivers employ an electric field probe or magnetic loop antenna, a sensitive audio preamplifier, isolating transformers, and a PC sound card to digitise the signal. Extensive digital signal processing is required to retrieve the weak signals from beneath interference from power line harmonics and VLF radio atmospherics. Useful received signal strengths are as low as 3×10^{−8} volts/meter (electric field) and 1×10^{−16} tesla (magnetic field), with signaling rates typically between 1 and 100 bits per hour.

=== PC based reception ===
Timing diagram of a frequency-shift keyed 18.1 kHz VLF signal, picked up using a small loop antenna and a sound card. The Morse code says "..33376.."; the vertical stripes are distant lightning strikes.

VLF signals are often monitored by radio amateurs using simple homemade VLF radio receivers based on personal computers (PCs). An aerial in the form of a coil of insulated wire is connected to the input of the soundcard of the PC (via a jack plug) and placed a few meters away from it. Fast Fourier transform (FFT) software in combination with a sound card allows reception of all frequencies below the Nyquist frequency simultaneously in the form of spectrogrammes.

Because CRT monitors are strong sources of noise in the VLF range, it is recommended to record the spectrograms with any PC CRT monitors turned off. These spectrograms show many signals, which may include VLF transmitters and the horizontal electron beam deflection of TV sets. The strength of the signal received can vary with a sudden ionospheric disturbance. These cause the ionization level to increase in the ionosphere producing a rapid change to the amplitude and phase of the received VLF signal.

== List of VLF transmissions ==
For a more detailed list, see List of VLF transmitters

Callsign	Frequency	Location of transmitter	Country	Remarks
—	11.905 kHz	various locations	(Russia)	Alpha navigation
—	12.649 kHz	various locations	(Russia)	Alpha navigation
—	14.881 kHz	various locations	(Russia)	Alpha navigation
HWU	15.1 kHz	Rosnay	(France)	400 kW
—	15.625 kHz	—		Frequency for horizontal deflection of electron beam in CRT televisions (576i)
—	15.734 kHz	—		Frequency for horizontal deflection of electron beam in CRT televisions (480i)
JXN	16.4 kHz	Gildeskål Municipality	(Norway)	
SAQ	17.2 kHz	Grimeton	(Sweden)	Only active at special occasions (Alexanderson Day)
NAA	17.8 kHz	VLF station (NAA) at Cutler, Maine	(US)	
RDL UPD UFQE UPP UPD8	18.1 kHz	various locations, including Matochkin Shar	(Russia)	
HWU	18.3 kHz	Le Blanc	(France)	Frequently inactive for long periods
RKS	18.9 kHz	various locations	(Russia)	Rarely active
GQD	19.6 kHz	Anthorn	(UK)	Many operation modes.
NWC	19.8 kHz	Exmouth, Western Australia	(AUS)	Used for submarine communication, 1 megawatt.
ICV	20.27 kHz	Tavolara	(Italy)	
RJH63 RJH66 RJH69 RJH77 RJH99	20.5 kHz	various locations	(Russia)	Time signal transmitter Beta
ICV	20.76 kHz	Tavolara	(Italy)	
HWU	20.9 kHz	Saint-Assise	(France)	
RDL	21.1 kHz	various locations	(Russia)	rarely active
NPM	21.4 kHz	Hawaii	(USA)	
HWU	21.75 kHz	Rosnay	(France)	
GZQ	22.1 kHz	Skelton	(UK)	
JJI	22.2 kHz	Ebino	(Japan)	
RJH63 RJH66 RJH69 RJH77 RJH99	23 kHz	various locations	(Russia)	Time signal transmitter Beta
DHO38	23.4 kHz	near Rhauderfehn	(Germany)	submarine communication
NAA	24 kHz	Cutler, Maine	(USA)	Used for submarine communication, at 2 megawatts
NLK	24.6 kHz	Oso, Washington	(USA)	192 kW
NLF	24.8 kHz	Arlington, Washington	(USA)	Used for submarine communication
NML	25.2 kHz	LaMoure, North Dakota	(USA)	
PNSH	14–25.2? kHz	Karachi coast, Sindh	(Pakistan)	

== See also ==
- Communication with submarines
- OMEGA Navigation System, 1971–1997
- Radio atmospheric
