= VLF Transmitter Cutler =

VLF radio transmitter operated by the US Navy

Coordinates: 44°38′42″N 67°16′57″W

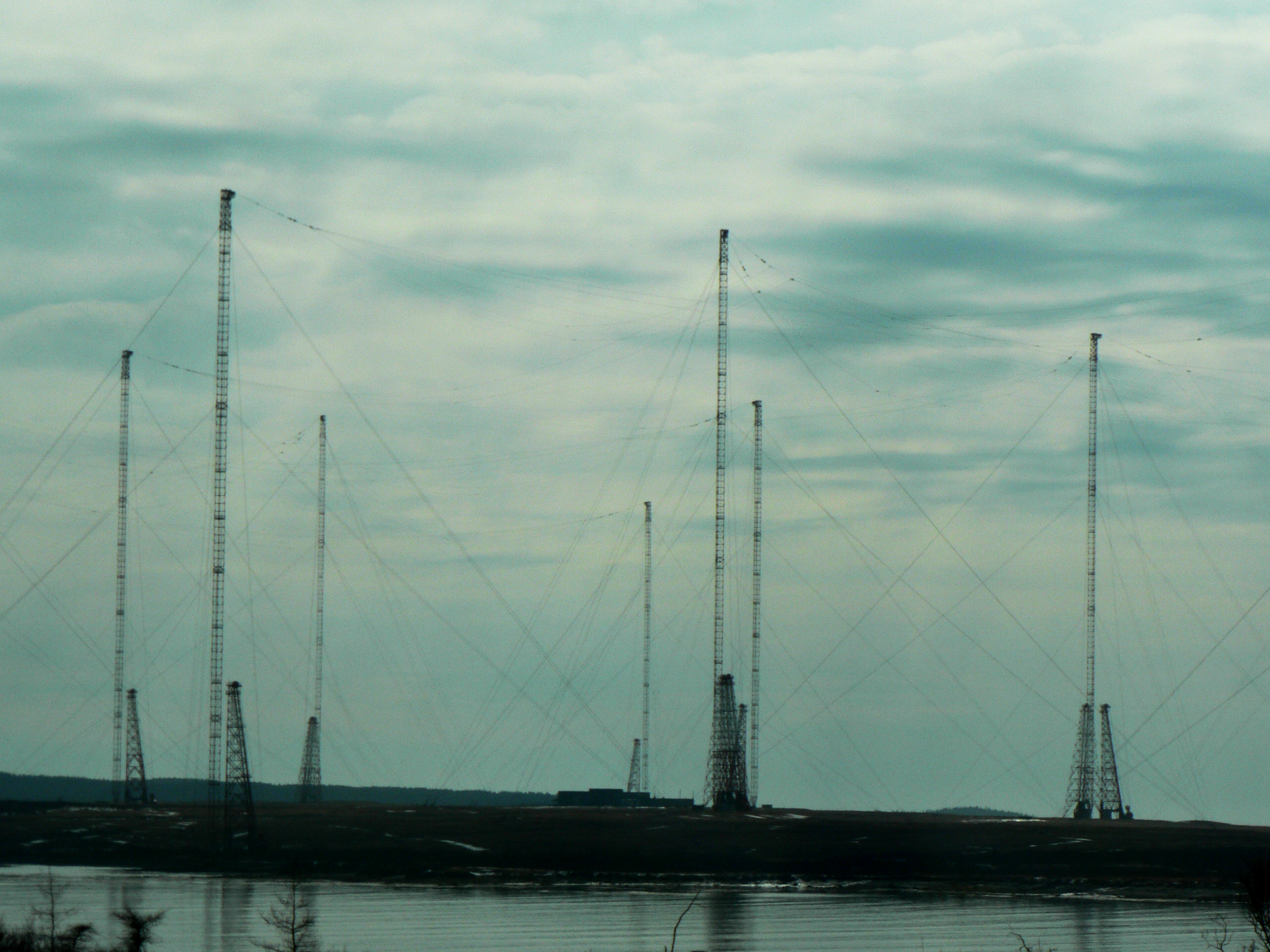
A few of the masts of the Cutler VLF Transmitter

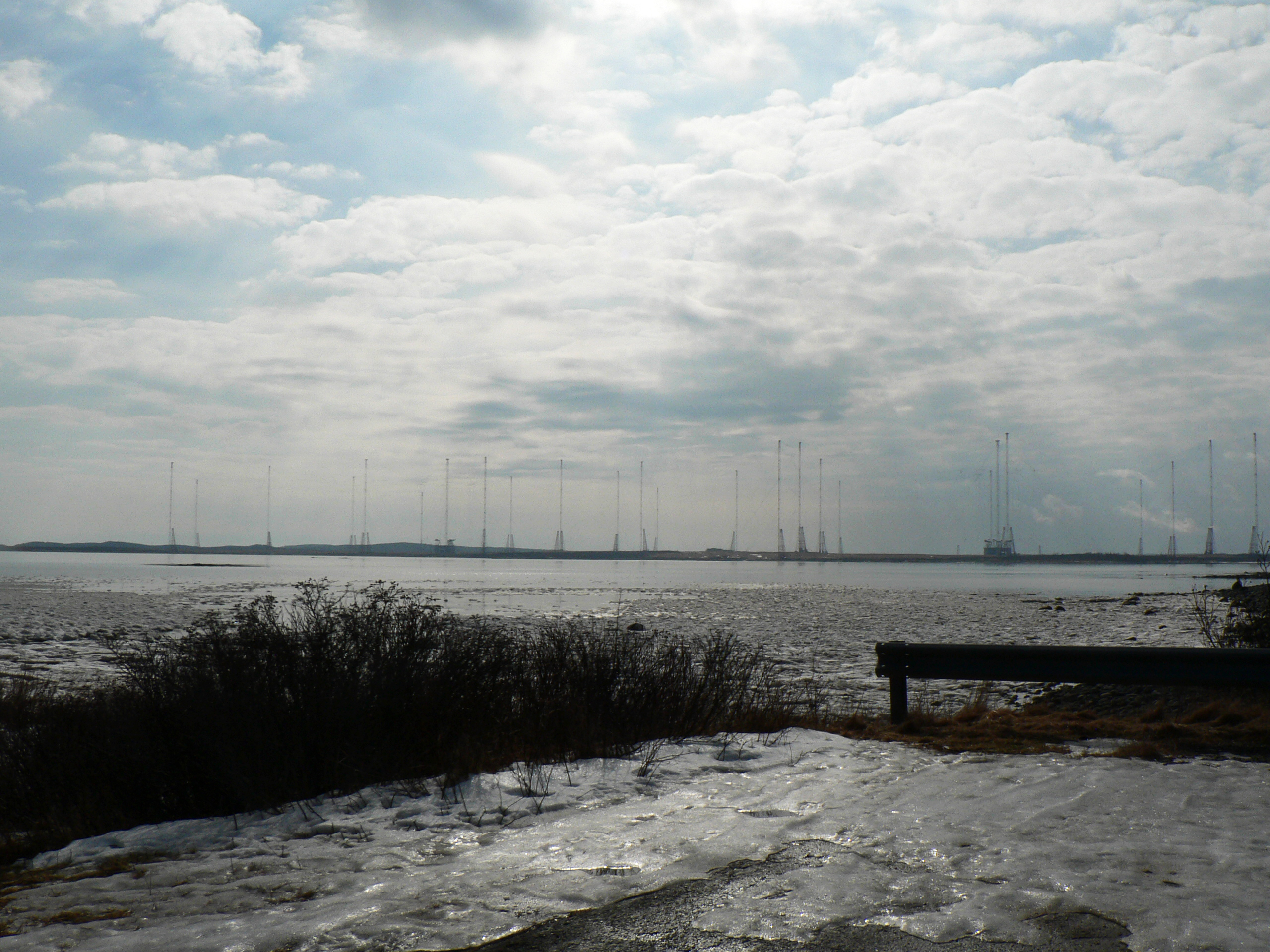
The Cutler VLF transmitter antenna masts as seen from across the Little Machias Bay at a distance of about 2 miles.

The VLF Transmitter Cutler is the United States Navy's very low frequency (VLF) shore radio station at Cutler, Maine. The station provides one-way communication to submarines of the Navy's Atlantic Fleet, both on the surface and submerged. It transmits with call sign NAA, at a frequency of 24 kHz and input power of up to 1.8 megawatts, and is one of the most powerful radio transmitters in the world.

== Description ==
The current Cutler Naval Station was built during 1960 and became operational on January 4, 1961. It has a transmission power of 2 megawatts. As with all VLF stations, the transmitter has a very small bandwidth, meaning it can only transmit coded text messages, at a relatively low data rate. The transmission consists of a continuously encrypted minimum-shift keying (MSK) signal capable of multi channel operations. The transmitter uses the frequency 24.0 kHz. During the past it used 17.8 kHz. The callsign of the station is NAA.

== Antenna ==
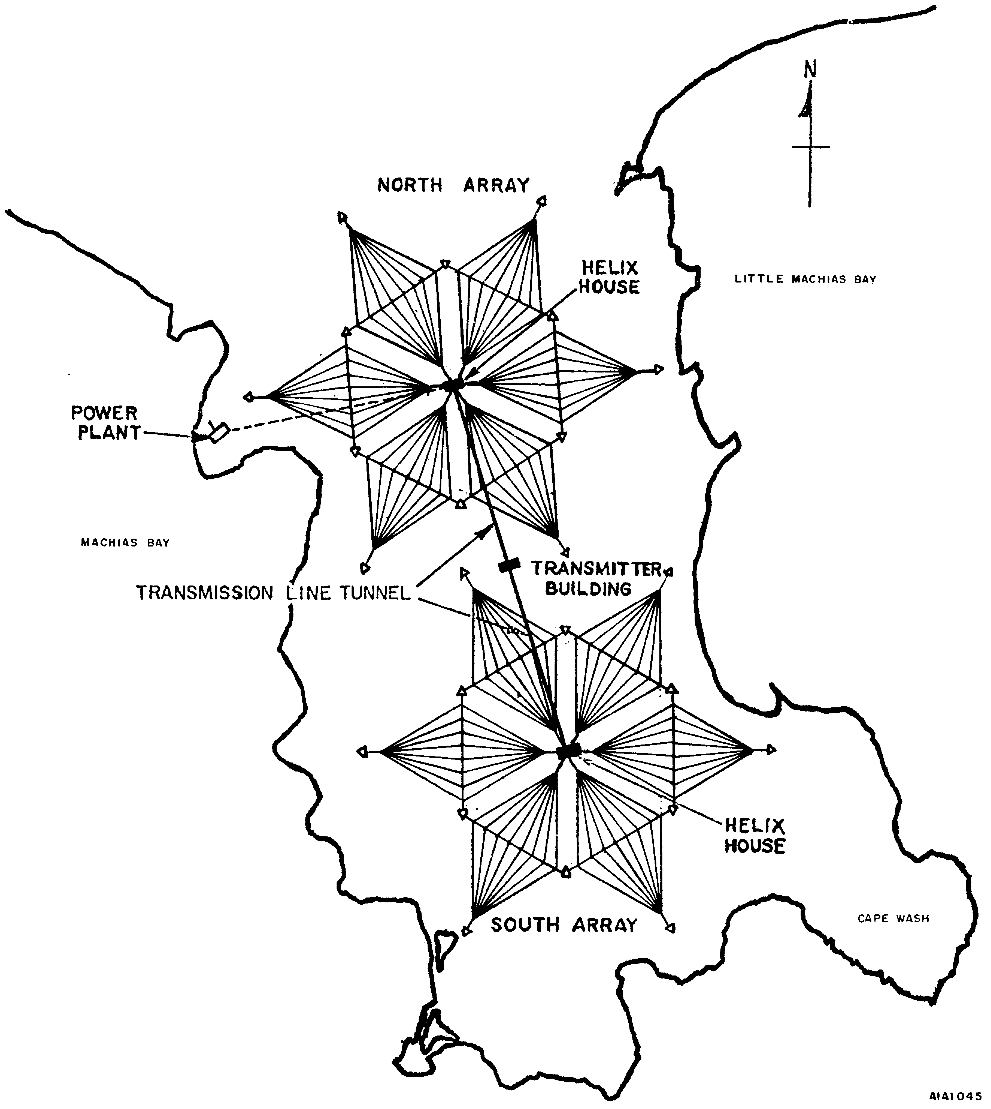
Diagram of the two antenna arrays

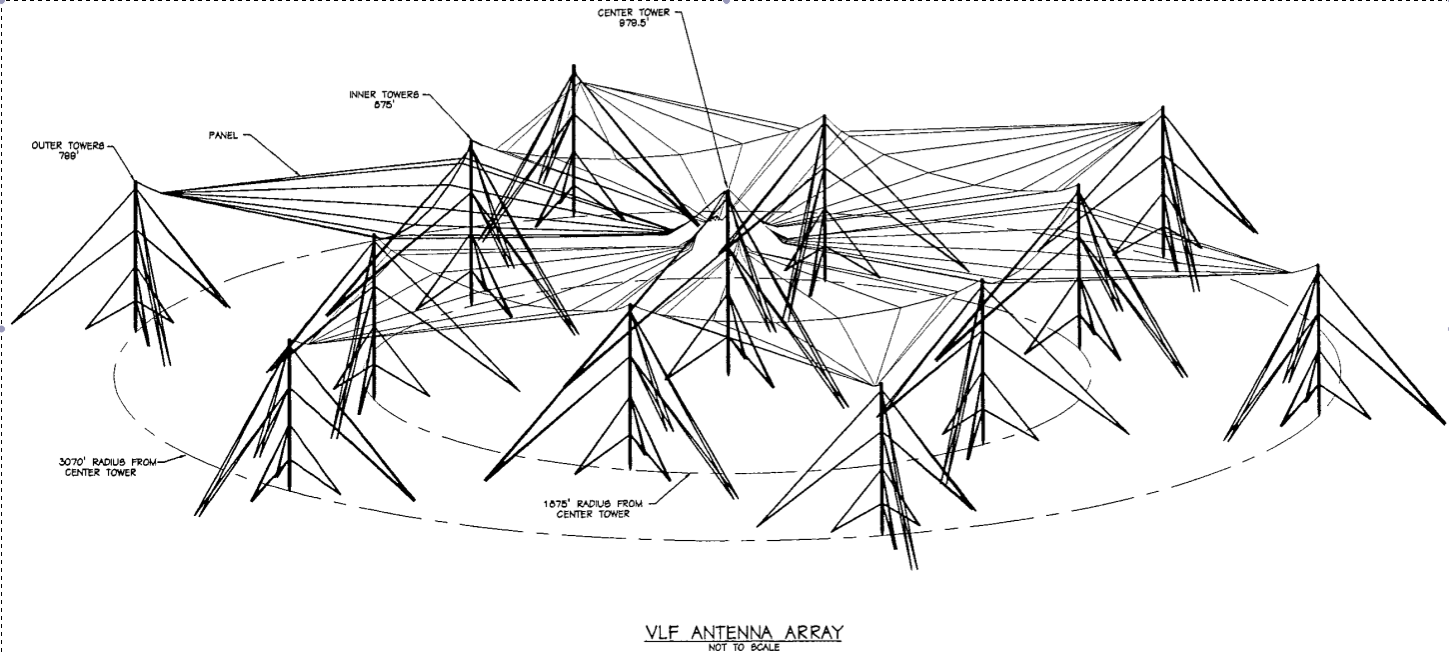
Isometric drawing of one array

The extensive antenna system consists of two separate identical specialized umbrella antenna arrays, designated the "north array" and the "south array". Each array has a tall metal mast in the center, surrounded by twelve more masts in two concentric rings of six, all supporting a network of horizontal cables. The cables are arranged to form six diamond-shaped (rhombic) "panels" radiating from the central tower at angles of 60°, so each array has a snowflake shape when viewed from above. Each panel is suspended from four masts: the central one, two in the inner ring, and one in the outer ring. The two arrays normally operate together as one antenna, but each is designed to function independently to allow the other one to be shut down for maintenance.

The central mast of each array is 304 m (997.5 ft) tall. Six 266.7 m (875 ft) tall masts are at a radius of 556 m (1,825 ft) around it. The remaining six masts in the array are 243.5 m (799 ft) tall, at a radius of 935.7 m (3,070 ft) from the center. Each array's diameter is 6,140 ft (1.87 km; 1.16 miles); the station's transmission wavelength is about 12.5 km (7.76 miles).

This type of antenna is called a trideco antenna. It functions as a capacitively top-loaded electrically short monopole. Vertical wires surrounding each central mast radiate the VLF radio waves, while the array of suspended horizontal cables functions as a large capacitor, increasing the efficiency of the vertical radiators. Under the antenna is a huge earthing system consisting of a radial network of cables buried in the ground, that serves as the bottom plate of the "capacitor".

The climate in Maine results in severe icing of the antenna wires during the winter; the antenna structures cannot support the large increase in weight that this causes. Therefore, the antenna cables are connected to a deicing system. When in use, it heats the wires by running a 60 Hz electric current through them. The power required to deice one array within a reasonable time is 3 MW or more – considerably higher than the transmitter output power. An antenna array cannot transmit while it is being deiced, and one reason for having two arrays is to allow one array to be deiced while transmission continues uninterrupted on the other one.

== Antenna maintenance ==
Antenna maintenance is performed during the summer months. During maintenance periods the station transmits using one array while work is performed on the other array, which is grounded. This allows continuous transmission, crucial since the Navy closed Annapolis (NSS), the only other East Coast VLF station.

The region where the two arrays come close together, near the transmitter house, is called the "bow-tie area". There are two panels and three towers from each array in this area. The fields on the grounded array are highest in the bow-tie area due to proximity to the active array. The present station operating procedure, based on a past RADHAZ survey, does not allow work on the bow-tie area towers or panels while transmitting either array. There is an ongoing tower painting project at Cutler scheduled for completion during the next few years. By the present station policy, completion of this project would require several months of total downtime.

Test transmissions have been arranged, during which only four panels of one array are connected to the transmitter. The objective of the four-panel tests was to allow painting and normal maintenance on the bow-tie area towers of the array which is entirely inactive. A secondary objective of the tests is to characterize the antenna operating parameters which had not been measured since changing to 24.0 kHz.

== See also ==
- Jim Creek Naval Radio Station
- Naval Communication Station Harold E. Holt
- Lualualei VLF transmitter
- Aguada transmission station
- List of masts
