= Jim Creek Naval Radio Station =

United States naval transmission facility near Oso, Washington

Coordinates: 48.2037°N 121.9167°W

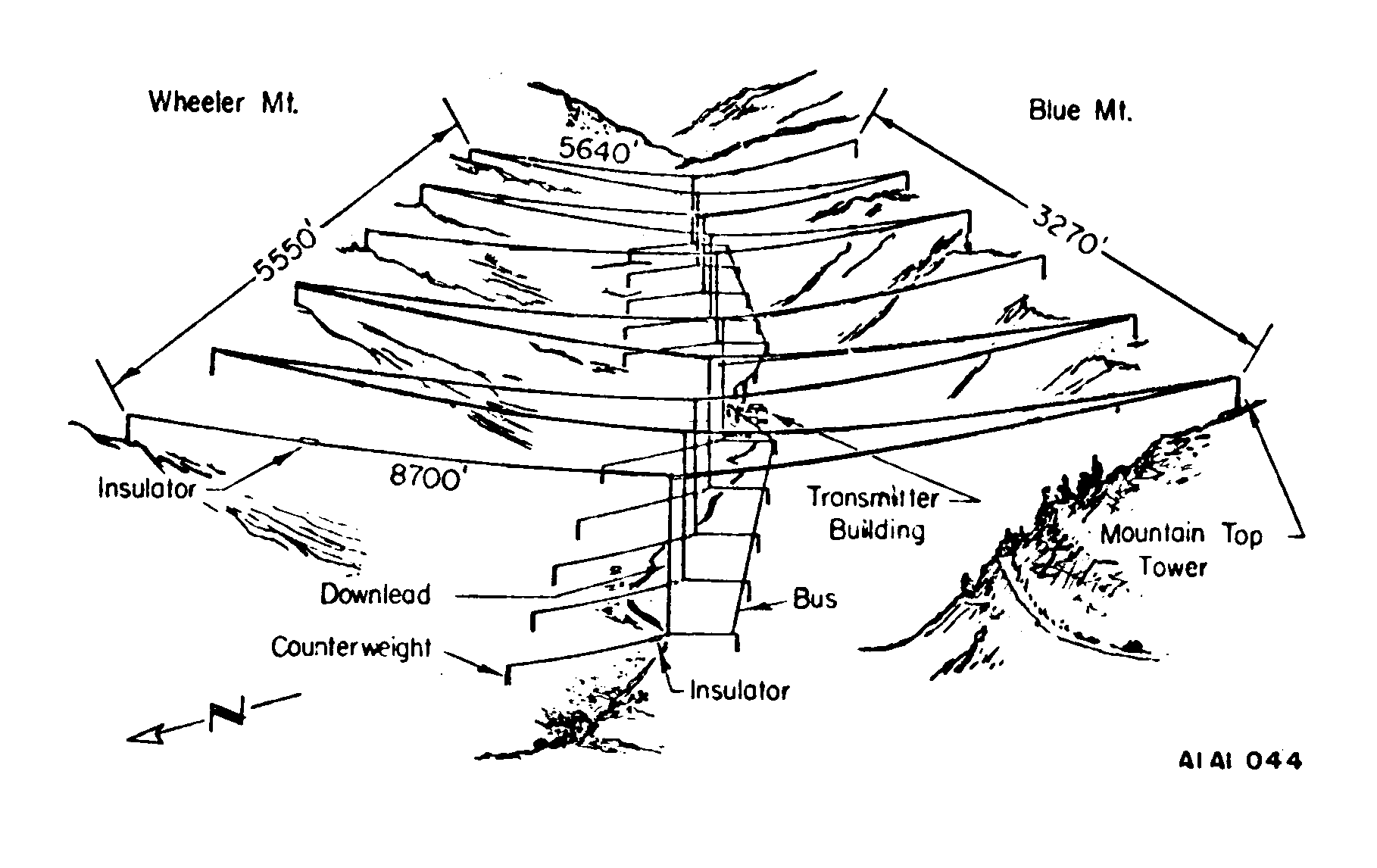
Diagram of Jim Creek antenna array

Jim Creek Naval Radio Station is a United States Navy very low frequency (VLF) radio transmitter facility at Jim Creek near Oso, Washington. The primary mission of this site is to communicate orders one-way to submarines of the Pacific fleet. Radio waves in the very low frequency band can penetrate seawater and be received by submerged submarines which cannot be reached by radio communications at other frequencies. Established in 1953, the transmitter radiates on 24.8 kHz with a power of 1.2 megawatts and a callsign of NLK, and is one of the most powerful radio transmitters in the world. The 5,000-acre (2,000 ha) site is largely forested in the foothills of the Cascades north of Seattle; the nearest city is Arlington, Washington.

== Antenna ==
Much of the site is devoted to the enormous overhead wire antenna array that is necessary to efficiently radiate the VLF waves. The antenna, shown above, consists of ten catenary cables, 5,640–8,700 ft (1,719–2,652 m, 1.1–1.6 miles) long, suspended in a zigzag pattern over the valley between Wheeler mountain and Blue mountain on twelve 200 ft. towers on the mountains' crests. Each cable receives energy from a vertical cable attached at the center, which drops down to the valley floor where it is fed by one of two "bus" transmission lines which extend along the valley from the transmitter building in the center.

This type of antenna, called a "valley-span" antenna, functions as a capacitively top-loaded electrically short monopole antenna. The vertical cables are the main radiating elements, and the horizontal cables serve to add capacitance to the top of the antenna, to increase the power radiated. The antenna is divided into 2 sections of 5 elements, each fed with its own transmission line. These normally operate together as one antenna, but can operate separately so one section can be shut down for maintenance without interrupting transmission. The floor of the valley under the antenna is covered with an elaborate network of buried cables that serve as the ground system for the transmitter.

This station is part of the command system which, in the event of a nuclear war, would transmit launch orders to US ballistic missile submarines in the Pacific fleet. The station was listed as a potential target for a Russian attack by a Russian state media report in early 2019.

== Gallery ==
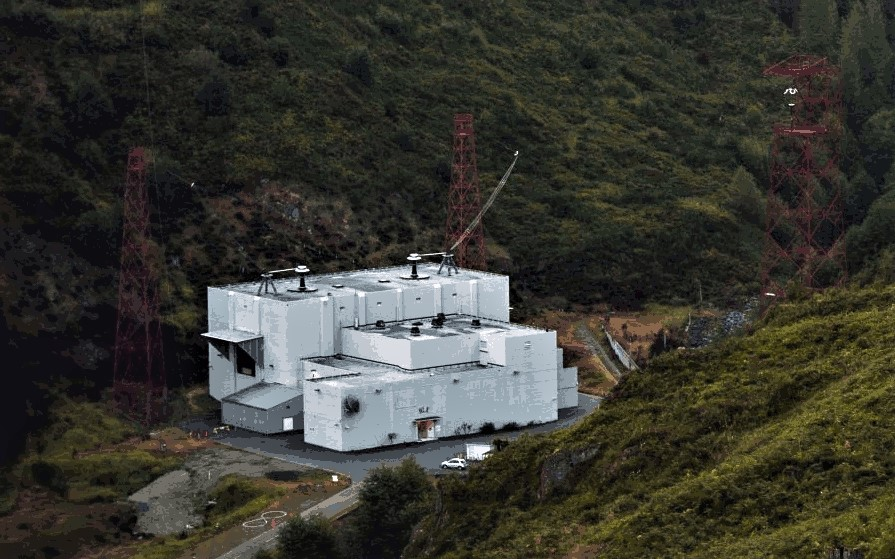
Transmitter building. From the two bushings on the roof, cables supply power to two feed buses which extend both directions along the valley and connect to the overhead antenna wires.

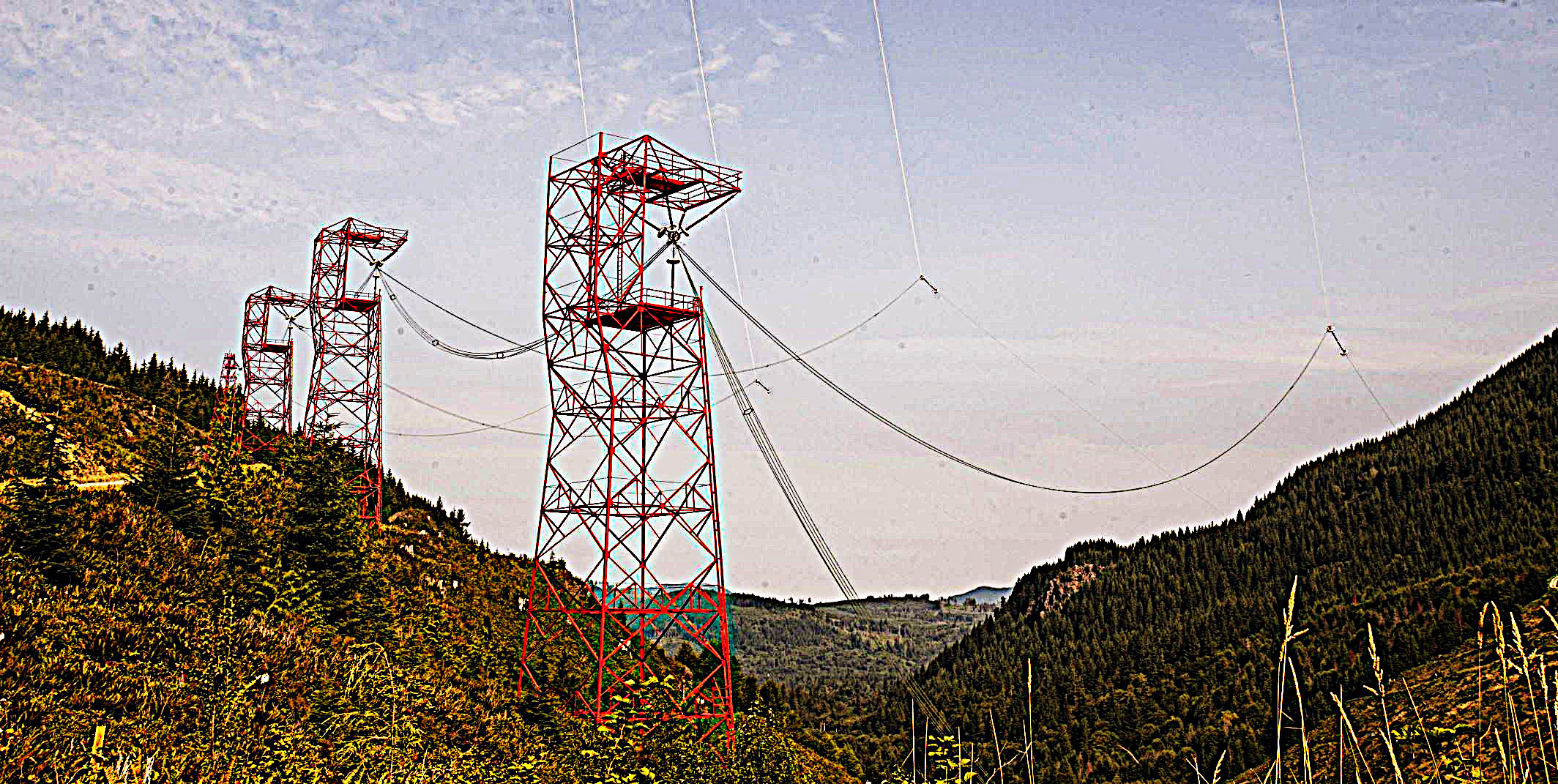
Towers supporting one of two antenna feed bus cables extending along the valley floor from the transmitter building. From each 44 m (145 ft) tower, a vertical feedline (faintly visible, top of picture) extends 270 m (900 ft) upward, to attach to the midpoint of each horizontal valleyspan cable.

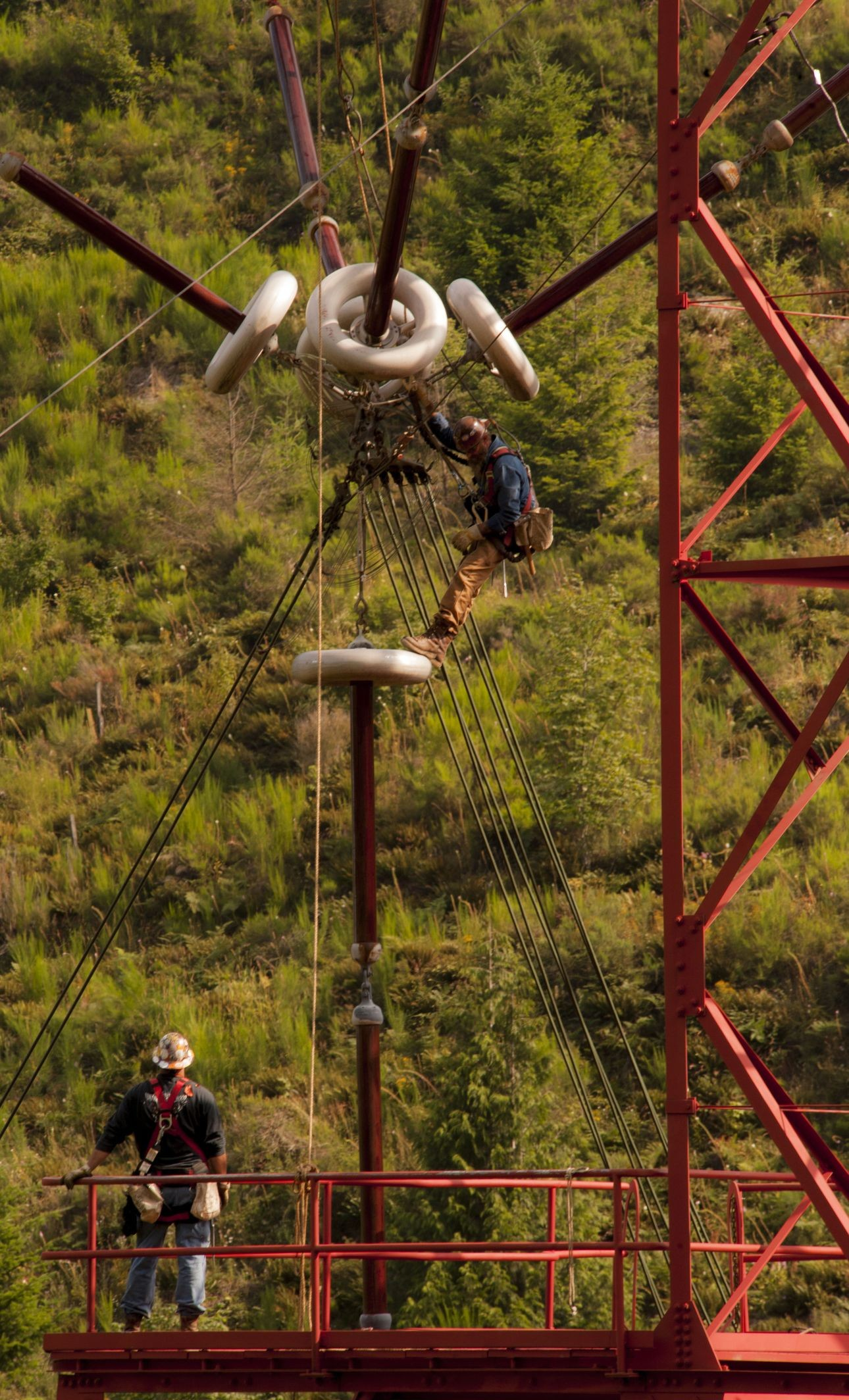
Contractors working on feed bus tower. The long insulator strings and corona rings are needed to withstand the very high voltage on the antenna.

Contractors repairing one of the 1.6 km (1 mile) long antenna wires that span the valley, which here is lowered to the ground for access.

== Recreation area ==
Jim Creek includes a regional outdoor recreation area for active duty personnel, reservists, retirees, DoD civilians, and sponsored guests. It offers a variety of recreational opportunities, including trout fishing, boating, and wildlife viewing. A group lodge is used for retreats and seminars; camping and picnic sites and other amenities are available. The area also includes hiking/bike riding trails and scenic viewpoints.

Programs include environmental education, outdoor recreation, and leadership training. Navy Legacy projects include trail construction and a salmon hatchery built in cooperation with the Stillaguamish Indian Tribe to restock the salmon spawning stream.

== Resource management ==
In 1991, the Navy purchased rights to 225 acres (0.91 km^{2}) of old growth forest, associated lakes, creeks, and wetlands, using $3 million of Legacy Resource Management Program to protect the largest remaining old-growth spruce and cedar forest in the Puget Sound trough. Natural mountain lakes provide a habitat for wildlife including beavers, river otters, waterfowl, and bald eagles.

Many trees in the 225 acres (0.91 km^{2}) are estimated to be up to 1,500–1,700 years old, with some over 260 feet (79 m) tall and 10 feet (3.0 m) in diameter. Jim Creek provides habitat for the marbled murrelet and other threatened species.

== Similar facilities ==
There is a similar but much larger facility in China, across the Jiangya reservoir at 29°35'21"N 110°44'23"E.

== See also ==
- Communication with submarines
- VLF Transmitter Cutler
- Naval Communication Station Harold E. Holt
- Lualualei VLF transmitter
