= VLF transmitter DHO38 =

VLF radio transmitter operated by German Navy

Coordinates: 53°04′55″N 7°36′59″E

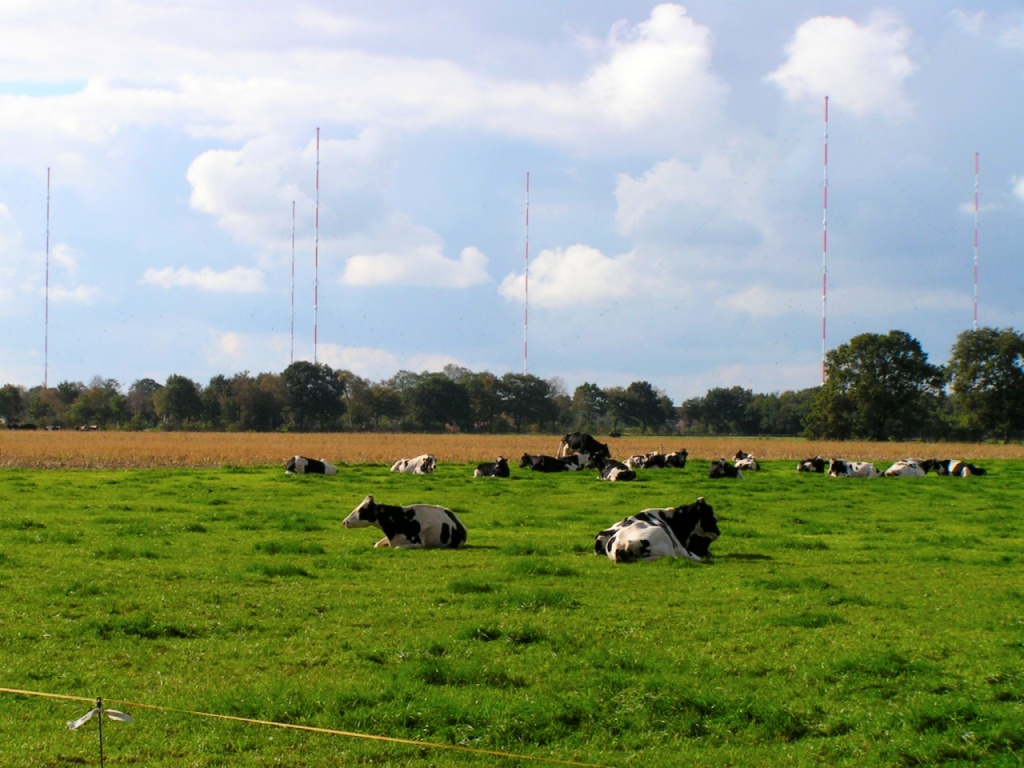
VLF transmitter DHO38

The VLF transmitter DHO38 (known as VLF/MSK Marinefunksendestelle Rhauderfehn or Marinefunksendestelle Saterland-Ramsloh) is a very low frequency (VLF) transmitter used by the German Navy near Rhauderfehn, Saterland, Germany. It is used to transmit coded orders to submarines of the German Navy and navies of other NATO countries.

DHO38 has transmitted since 1982 on 23.4 kHz with a power of up to 800 kilowatts, although other sources says 300kW is the usual power. Each mast is powered by 100kW transmitter but all masts operate at once. The transmitter is able to transmit signals in a range from 14 to 50 kHz. DHO38 uses an umbrella antenna which is carried from eight steel tube masts each with a height of 352.8 metres (1,157 ft). Each pylon stands on three-metre-tall ceramic cylinders, which serve as insulators for voltages up to 300 kV. The masts are equipped with cylindrical oscillation dampers for better protection against storms.

Each mast has an antenna tuning hut and sits on a copper mat 30cm under the ground. The site is wet which helps improve the performance of the antenna. The transmitter is capable of transmitting signals to submarines worldwide to depths of approx. 30 metres.

In 2016 the transmitters were updated to semi-conductor technology from the previous valve based ones.

== Transmission ==
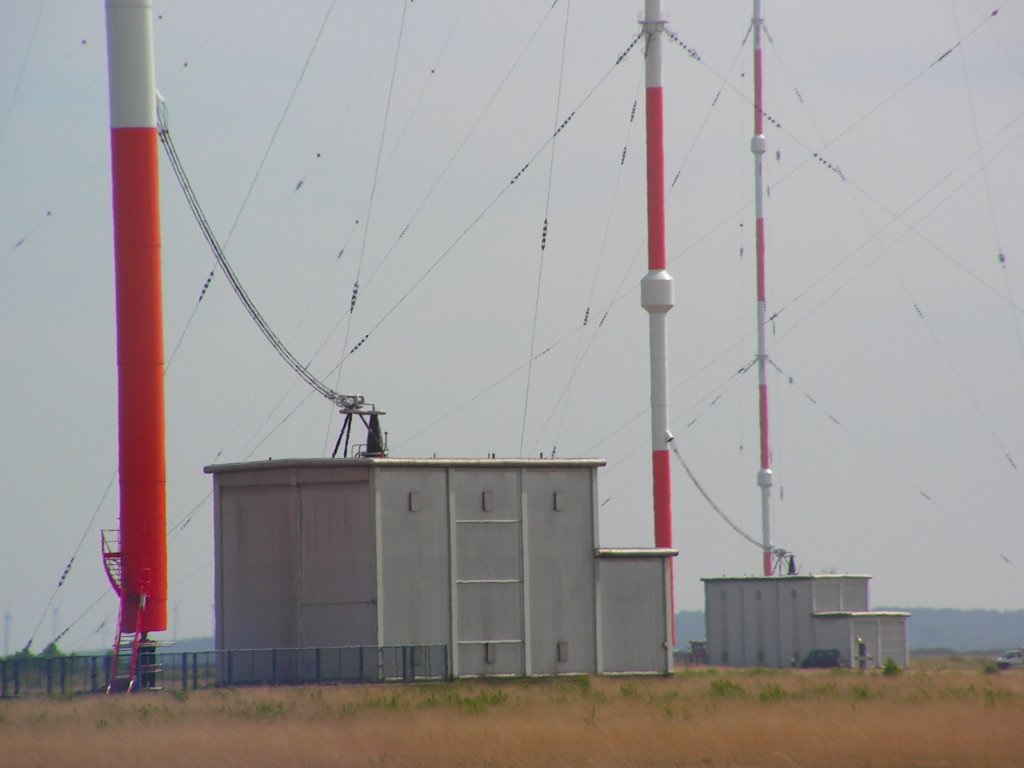
The masts and cables

The signal from DHO38 is an MSK-coded signal with 4 x 50 baud on all 4 channels on frequency 23.4 kHz. All transmissions from DHO38 are encrypted. The messages transmitted via DHO38 are processed at the naval telecommunications center Glücksburg. They are sent "by cable" from German and NATO offices to the protective structure there and are prepared for transmission by the responsible telecommunications operators.
