= Cutler, Maine =

Town in Maine, United States

- Town
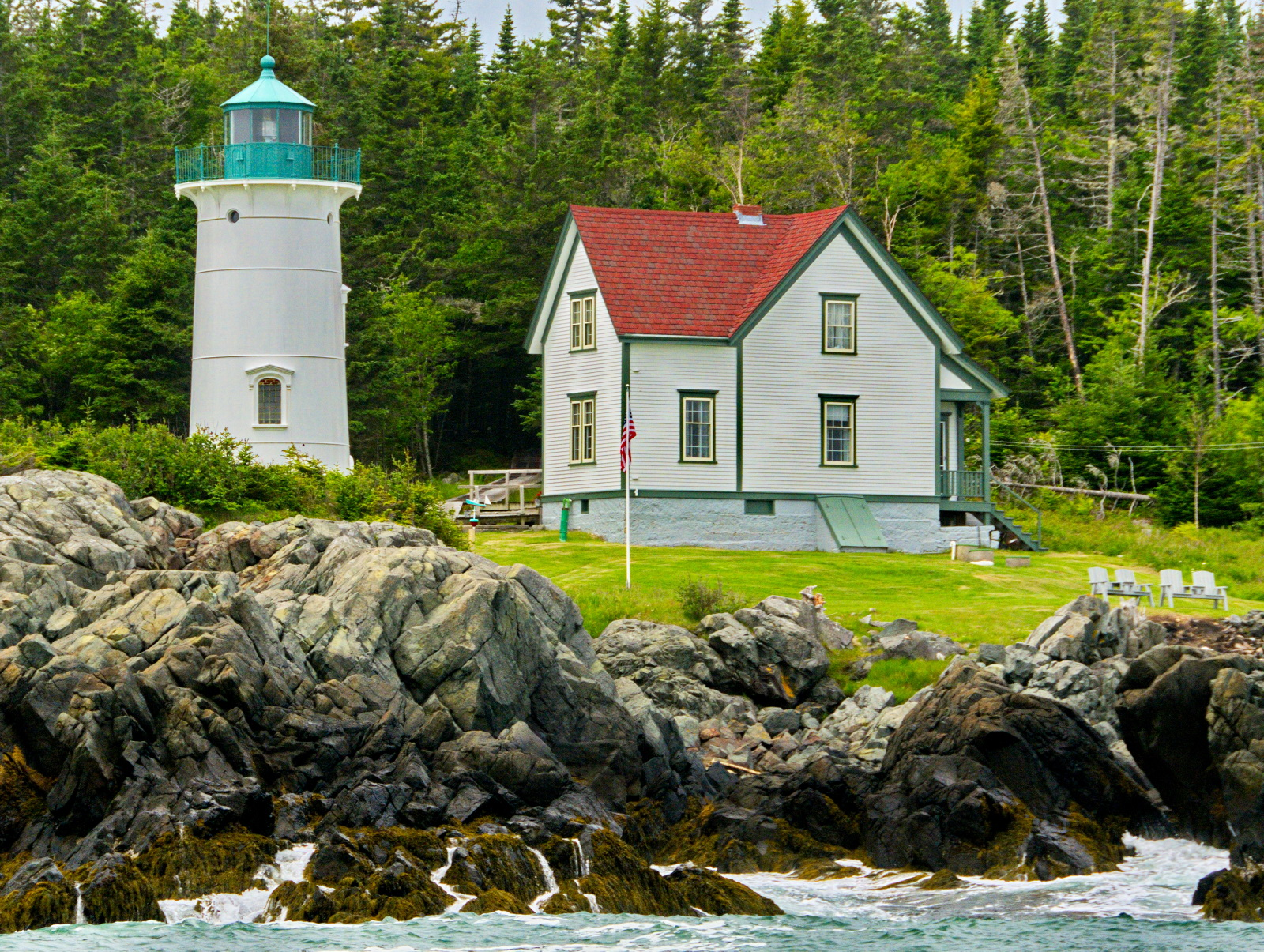
- Cutler lighthouse

- Location within Maine Location within the United States
- Coordinates: 44°39′52″N 67°14′22″W
- Country: United States
- State: Maine
- County: Washington

Area
  - Total: 117.93 sq mi (305.44 km^{2})
  - Land: 46.95 sq mi (121.60 km^{2})
  - Water: 70.98 sq mi (183.84 km^{2})
- Elevation: 131 ft (40 m)

Population (2020)
  - Total: 524
  - Density: 11/sq mi (4.3/km^{2})
- Time zone: UTC−5 (Eastern (EST))
  - Summer (DST): UTC−4 (EDT)
- ZIP Code: 04626
- Area code: 207
- FIPS code: 23-15920
- GNIS feature ID: 582429
- Website: Town of Cutler

Cutler is a town in Washington County, Maine, United States. The town was named after Joseph Cutler, an early settler, who hailed from Newburyport, Massachusetts. The population was 524 at the 2020 census.

== Demographics ==
Historical population
| Census | Pop. | Note | %± |
|---|---|---|---|
| 1830 | 454 | | — |
| 1840 | 657 | | 44.7% |
| 1850 | 820 | | 24.8% |
| 1860 | 890 | | 8.5% |
| 1870 | 925 | | 3.9% |
| 1880 | 829 | | −10.4% |
| 1890 | 662 | | −20.1% |
| 1900 | 565 | | −14.7% |
| 1910 | 585 | | 3.5% |
| 1920 | 584 | | −0.2% |
| 1930 | 492 | | −15.8% |
| 1940 | 481 | | −2.2% |
| 1950 | 483 | | 0.4% |
| 1960 | 654 | | 35.4% |
| 1970 | 588 | | −10.1% |
| 1980 | 726 | | 23.5% |
| 1990 | 779 | | 7.3% |
| 2000 | 623 | | −20.0% |
| 2010 | 507 | | −18.6% |
| 2020 | 524 | | 3.4% |
U.S. Decennial Census

=== 2010 census ===
As of the census of 2010, there were 507 people, 215 households, and 144 families living in the town. The population density was 10.8 inhabitants per square mile (4.2/km^{2}). There were 372 housing units at an average density of 7.9 per square mile (3.1/km^{2}). The racial makeup of the town was 96.1% White, 2.4% Native American, 0.4% Asian, and 1.2% from two or more races. Hispanic or Latino of any race were 0.8% of the population.

There were 215 households, of which 29.3% had children under the age of 18 living with them, 58.6% were married couples living together, 5.1% had a female householder with no husband present, 3.3% had a male householder with no wife present, and 33.0% were non-families. Of all households, 28.8% were made up of individuals, and 13.5% had someone living alone who was 65 years of age or older. The average household size was 2.36 and the average family size was 2.87.

The median age in the town was 45.2 years. 24.3% of residents were under the age of 18; 3.3% were between the ages of 18 and 24; 22% were from 25 to 44; 30% were from 45 to 64; and 20.3% were 65 years of age or older. The gender makeup of the town was 55.2% male and 44.8% female.

=== 2000 census ===
As of the census of 2000, there were 623 people, 238 households, and 178 families living in the town. The population density was 13.3 inhabitants per square mile (5.1/km^{2}). There were 348 housing units at an average density of 7.4 per square mile (2.9/km^{2}). The racial makeup of the town was 96.47% White, 1.61% African American, 0.64% Native American, 0.48% Asian, and 0.80% from two or more races. Hispanic or Latino of any race were 2.09% of the population.

There were 238 households, out of which 38.2% had children under the age of 18 living with them, 66.4% were married couples living together, 3.4% had a female householder with no husband present, and 24.8% were non-families. Of all households, 20.6% were made up of individuals, and 7.6% had someone living alone who was 65 years of age or older. The average household size was 2.56 and the average family size was 2.95.

In the town, the population was spread out, with 28.4% under the age of 18, 6.9% from 18 to 24, 31.9% from 25 to 44, 20.4% from 45 to 64, and 12.4% who were 65 years of age or older. The median age was 33 years. For every 100 females, there were 112.6 males. For every 100 females age 18 and over, there were 118.6 males.

The median income for a household in the town was $30,625, and the median income for a family was $35,313. Males had a median income of $26,490 versus $15,625 for females. The per capita income for the town was $13,170. About 11.2% of families and 11.6% of the population were below the poverty line, including 10.6% of those under age 18 and 21.8% of those age 65 or over.

== Geography ==
According to the United States Census Bureau, the town has a total area of 117.93 square miles (305.44 km^{2}), of which 46.95 square miles (121.60 km^{2}) is land and 70.98 square miles (183.84 km^{2}) is water.

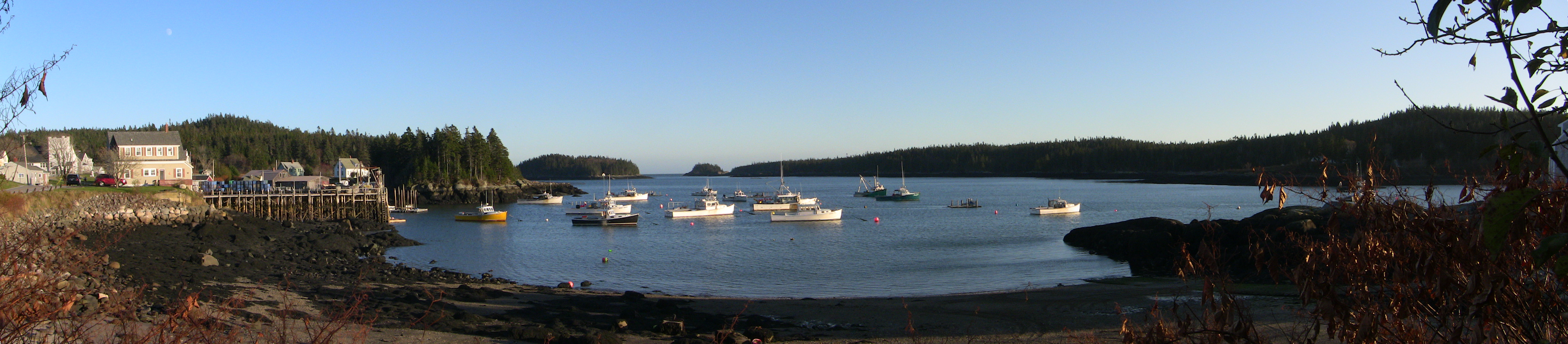
Panorama of Cutler harbor at low tide in November

== Points of interest ==
- Cross Island National Wildlife Refuge
- Cutler Naval Station, a huge station for transmitting signals in the VLF-range to submerged submarines
- Little River Lighthouse, a historic lighthouse located on a 15-acre island in Cutler's harbor.
- Machias Seal Island, a disputed territory between Canada and the United States, and bird sanctuary noted for its large atlantic puffin population.

== Education ==
The community is in the Cutler School District. Bay Ridge Elementary School is a part of the Alternative Organizational System 96.

== Notable person ==
- Blanche Craig (1866–1940), actress
