= List of VLF transmitters =

Countries with VLF Transmitter Stations

A list of VLF transmitters and LF transmitters, which work or worked on frequencies below 100 kHz.

== Operational ==
Name / Call sign	Location	Country	Frequency	Coordinates	Remarks
NOV Alpha Transmitter Novosibirsk	Bolotnoye, Bolotninsky District	Russia	11.905 kHz	55°45′22″N 84°26′52.4″E	Alpha-Navigation
KRA Alpha Transmitter Krasnodar	Poltavskaya, Krasnoarmeysky District	Russia	12.649 kHz	45°24′12″N 38°09′29″E	Alpha-Navigation, also RJH63
KOM Alpha Transmitter Komsomolskamur	Khabarovsk	Russia	12.649 kHz	50°04′24″N 136°36′24″E	Alpha-Navigation
MUR Alpha Transmitter Murmansk	Revda	Russia	12.649 kHz	68°02′8″N 34°41′00″E	Alpha-Navigation
ASH Alpha Transmitter Ashkabad	Seydi, Türkmenabat	Turkmenistan	12.649 kHz	39°28′16″N 62°43′07″E	Alpha-Navigation
LaMoure - Omega Station D	LaMoure, North Dakota	USA	12.1 kHz	46.365987°N 98.335667°W	now operated by US Navy on 25.2 kHz
Monte Grande Radio Station	Monte Grande	Argentina	17.33 kHz; 23.6 kHz	34.757502°S 58.509128°W	Appears derelict. 718 Foot (219 meter) towers
HWU	Rosnay	France	15.1 kHz; 18.3 kHz; 21.75 kHz	46.714119°N 1.244309°E	1171 foot (357 meter) tower
Zendmast Ruiselede	Ruiselede	Belgium	16.2 kHz; 51.25 kHz	51°04′52″N 3°20′34″E	used before World War II three 287 metres, today active on higher frequency with an antenna of four masts with heights of 121 and 122 metres
JXN	Gildeskål	Norway	16.4 kHz	66.982337°N 13.872471°E	7,759-foot (2,365 m) valley-span antenna
VTX	Vijayanarayanam	India	17.0 kHz	8.387°N 77.752°E	1545 foot (471 meter) tower
SAQ	Grimeton, Varberg	Sweden	17.2 kHz	57.113958°N 12.404425°E	Only active at special occasions (Alexanderson Day)
NAA	Cutler, Maine	USA	17.8 kHz; 24.0 kHz	44.644506°N 67.284565°W	997 ft (304 meter) tall
RDL	Krasnodar	Russia	18.1 kHz	44°46′24″N 39°32′50″E	425 metres tall central tower
INS Kattabomman	Vijayanarayanam	India	18.2 kHz	8.3869497°N 77.7505891°E	
GQD	Anthorn, Cumbria	UK	19.58 kHz; 22.10 kHz	54.911683°N 3.278738°W	13 towers, 745-foot (227 m) tall
NWC	Exmouth	Australia	19.8 kHz	21.816325°S 114.16546°E	389 metres tall central tower
ICV	Tavolara, Sardinia	Italy	20.27 kHz; 20.76 kHz	40.922889°N 9.732052°E	Valley-span antenna fixed on 133 metres and 114 metres tall masts
RJH69	Vileyka	Belarus	20.5 kHz	54.463204°N 26.775827°E	Time signal transmitter Beta
RJH77	Arkhangelsk	Russia	20.5 kHz	64.360491°N 41.568489°E	Time signal transmitter Beta
RJH99	Nizhny Novgorod	Russia	20.5 kHz	56.171945°N 43.931667°E	Time signal transmitter Beta
RJH66	Bishkek	Kyrgyzstan	20.5 kHz	43.039444°N 73.6125°E	Time signal transmitter Beta
RAB99	Khabarovsk	Russia	20.5 kHz	48.48555°N 134.82333°E	Time signal transmitter Beta
RJH63	Martanskaya, Belorechensk	Russia	20.5 kHz	44.773640°N 39.547262°E	Time signal transmitter Beta
NPM	Lualualei, Hawaii	USA	21.4 kHz	21.420382°N 158.153912°W	1,503-foot (458 m) tower installed 1972, since the collapse of Warsaw radio mast tallest structure insulated against ground
GVT	Skelton Cumbria	UK	22.1 kHz	54.731929°N 2.883359°W	1,198 foot (365-meter) tower
JJI	Ebino	Japan	22.2 kHz or 22.1 kHz	32.092247°N 130.829095°E	Antenna on 8 masts with a height of 270 metres
DHO38	Rhauderfehn	Germany	23.4 kHz	53.087341°N 7.608652°E	8 masts with a height of 352.9 metres, submarine communication
NLK (Jim Creek)	Seattle, Washington	USA	24.8 kHz	48.203633°N 121.916828°W	valley-span antenna
	Mokpo	South Korea	24.1 kHz; 25.0 kHz	34.682222°N 126.446944°E	Two 1,476-foot (450 m) towers, built about 2006.
Denizkoy VLF Transmitter TBB	Bafa, Didim district	Turkey	26.7 kHz	37.409420°N 27.325273°E	Two 1,247-foot (380 m) towers, built about 2000.
DG2	Dimona	Israel	29.7 kHz; 26.0 kHz	30.975696°N 35.098668°E	Two 1300 foot (400 meter) tall towers
Goedverwacht Transmitting Station	Cape Town	South Africa		33.787289°S 18.694761°E	
TFK	Grindavík	Iceland	37.6 kHz (37.5 kHz center)	63.850833°N 22.451667°W	1,000 ft (304.8-meter) tower
JJY	Otakadoyayama Transmitter, Tamura	Japan	40.0 kHz	37.372557°N 140.849007°E	Time signal
SRC	Grimeton	Sweden	40.4 kHz	57.113958°N 12.404425°E	Shares antenna with SAQ, used for encrypted messages to Swedish Navy
NAU Naval Communications Station Puerto Rico	Aguada, Puerto Rico	USA	40.75 kHz	18.398775°N 67.177486°W	1,205-foot (367 m) tower
NSY	Niscemi	Italy	45.9 kHz	37.125654°N 14.436325°E	US Navy, 252 metres tall mast
SXA	Kato Souli, Marathon	Greece	49.0 kHz	38.145186°N 24.019703°E	820 foot (250 meter) tower
NPG	Dixon, California	USA	55.5 kHz	38.371505°N 121.775569°W	2 masts 194.2 metres tall, submarine communications
LBH	Gossa	Norway	57.7 kHz	62.785927°N 6.90083°E	200 metres tall mast
WWVB	Fort Collins, Colorado	USA	60.0 kHz	40.678056°N 105.046944°W	Time signal
JJY	Haganeyama Transmitter, Saga	Japan	60.0 kHz	33.465539°N 130.175516°E	Time signal
MSF	Anthorn Radio Station, Anthorn	UK	60.0 kHz	54.91°N 3.28°W	Time signal
Italian Navy	Rome	Italy	65.25 kHz	41.975452°N 12.359494°W	150 metres tall masts
RBU	Moscow	Russia	66.666 kHz	55.730481°N 38.152471°E	Time signal
RBU	Taldom	Russia	66.666 kHz	56.733333°N 37.663333°E	Time signal
BPC	Pucheng	China	68.5 kHz	34.948333°N 109.542778°E	Time signal
BSF	Guishan	Taiwan	77.5 kHz	25.005556°N 121.365°E	Time signal
DCF77	Mainflingen, Mainhausen	Germany	77.5 kHz	50.014234°N 9.011487°E	a major time signal in Europe
SAS2	Gudinge, Lövstabruk	Sweden	42.5 kHz	60.524275°N 18.012192°E	695 foot, 212-metre tall mast
	Tving	Sweden		56.275050°N 15.487858°E	695 foot, 212-metre tall mast
RNAS Rattray (MKL, GYW1)	Crimond	UK	82.8 kHz; 51.95 kHz	57.617467°N 1.887617°W	tallest mast 274.3 metres high, site now home to a high frequency transmitter station forming part of the Defence High Frequency Communications Service
RNAS Inskip (HMS Nightjar) (GIZ20)	Inskip	UK	61.84 kHz	53.830074°N 2.834262°W	VLF transmissions of Morse code to ships close to U.K. in the 1980s; now used as a military high frequency radio transmitting station
FTA2	Saint Assise	France	16.9 kHz; 20.9 kHz	48.544910°N 2.576294°E	
La Regine (FUG)	Villemagne	France	62.6 kHz	43.386781°N 2.097364°E	
Kerlouan transmitter (FUE)	Kerlouan	France	62.6 kHz; 65.8 kHz	48.637736°N 4.350769°W	
3SB	Datong	China	20.6 kHz; 10.6 kHz	39.942959°N 113.247886°E	
3SA	Changde	China	20.6 kHz	29.589879°N 110.738701°E	valley-spun antenna
REN	Guardamar del Segura	Spain	145.0 kHz	38.071871°N 0.664625°W	

== Demolished ==
Name / Call sign	Location	Country	Frequency	Coordinates	Remarks
Trinidad - Omega Station B	Chaguaramas, Trinidad and Tobago	Trinidad and Tobago	12.0 kHz	10.699738°N 61.638386°W	valley span antenna dismantled, station replaced by the Paynesville Liberia Station in 1976
Paynesville - Omega Station B	Paynesville	Liberia	12.0 kHz	6.305442°N 10.662068°W	1,368-foot (417 m) tower demolished in 2011
Kaneohe - Omega Station C	Haiku Valley, Hawaii	USA	11.8 kHz	21.404811°N 157.830834°W	5,000-foot (1,500 m) valley span antenna, decommissioned in 1997. Antenna dismantled, deteriorating transmitter building and Haiku Stairs remain
Bratland - Omega Station A (LEA)	Brattland	Norway	12.1 kHz	66.419323°N 13.129950°E	11,500-foot (3,500 m) valley span antenna over salt water. dismantled in 2002. Building and helix house remains
Plaine Chabrier - Omega Station E	Saint-Paul	Réunion	12.3 kHz	20.974153°S 55.289973°E	1,404-foot (428 m) tower demolished in 1999
Golfo Nuevo - Omega Station F	Golfo Nuevo, Chubut	Argentina	12.9 kHz	43.053524°S 65.190763°W	1,201-foot (366 m) tower demolished in 1998
Woodside - Omega Station G (VL3DEF)	Woodside, Victoria	Australia	13.0 kHz; 18.6 kHz	38.481268°S 146.935326°E	1,417-foot (432 m) foot tower demolished in 2015
Shushi-Wan - Omega Station H	Tsushima Island	Japan	12.8 kHz	34.614763°N 129.453830°E	1,276-foot (389 m) foot tower dismantled in 1998
GBZ Criggion	Criggion, Wales	UK	15.2 kHz	52.72246°N 3.06295°W	towers and antenna demolished in 2003. Derelict transmitter building remains
Kahuku Marconi Transmitter	Kahuku, Oahu, Hawaii	USA	16.1 kHz	21.7062°N 157.9731°W	shut down in 1939, deteriorated transmitter building and support buildings remain
Coltano transmitting station	Coltano	Italy		43.649841°N 10.408634°E	4 masts with a height of 250 metres, destroyed at the end of World War II
Waunfawr Marconi Transmitter	Waunfawr, Wales	UK	21.2 kHz	53.1239°N 4.1935°W	Closed in 1938, only the transmitter building remains
Radio Kootwijk	Apeldoorn	Netherlands	24 kHz	52.173414°N 5.818857°E	last mast demolished in 1980, iconic transmitter building remains
Table Head Marconi Transmitter	Glace Bay, Nova Scotia	Canada	37.5 kHz	46.21118°N 59.9525°W	dismantled and moved to Marconi Towers, Nova Scotia in 1904
Marconi Towers Transmitter	Marconi Towers, Glace Bay, Nova Scotia	Canada	37.5 kHz	46.1547273°N 59.9455246°W	closed and sold in 1946. Manager's house and ruins remain.
Marion Marconi Transmitter	Marion, Massachusetts	USA	25.8 kHz	41.7131401°N 70.7748406°W	shut down in 1957, towers demolished in 1960. Transmitter and support buildings remain
New Brunswick Marconi Transmitter	New Brunswick, New Jersey	USA	21.8 kHz	40.51529°N 74.48895°W	shut down in 1948, demolished in 1953. Only the station cottage remains
Bolinas Marconi Transmitter	Bolinas, California	USA	19.2 kHz	37.913°N 122.72825°W	shut down in 1946. Transmitter building, MF and HF transmitters and one cottage remain
RCA Radio Central	Rocky Point, New York	USA	18.3 kHz	40.92379°N 72.9356°W	last VLF tower demolished in 1977
NSS Annapolis	Annapolis, Maryland	USA	21.4 kHz	38.977778°N 76.453333°W	shut down in 1996, 1,200-foot (370 m) tower demolished in 1999, three 600-foot (180 m) towers remain
Forestport Tower	Forestport, New York	USA		43.44485337°N 75.0861464°W	1,205-foot (367 m) tower demolished in 1998
Tuckerton Transmitter	Tuckerton, New Jersey	USA	22.1 kHz	39.558495°N 74.370570°W	shut down 1948, 820-foot (250 m) tower demolished 1955, transmitter building remains
Silver Creek Communications Annex	Silver Creek, Nebraska	USA		41.3461996°N 97.72176109°W	1,226-foot (374 m) tower demolished in 1995. Building remains.
Hawes Radio Relay Facility	Hinkley, California	USA		34.9174009°N 117.377046654°W	1,226-foot (374 m) tower and all buildings demolished in 1986
GBR	Rugby	UK	16.0 kHz; 60 kHz	52.367290°N 1.188524°W	shut-down in 2003, demolished in 2007
JAP	Yosami, Kariya, Aichi	Japan	17.442 kHz	34.971474°N 137.017018°E	250m masts, demolished
NBA Summit Naval Radio Station	Summit, Balboa, Canal Zone	Panama	18.6 kHz; 24.0 kHz	9.0699425°N 79.6333477°W	megawatt naval VLF station, demolished
NPO Sangley Point Naval Radio Station	Cavite	Philippines	21.5 kHz	14.495°N 120.908°E	Three 600-foot (180 m) VLF towers demolished after World War II
Malabar Radio Station	Malabar	Indonesia		7.116281°S 107.606183°E	valley span-antenna, demolished
NPM	Pearl Harbor, Hawaii	USA	26.1 kHz	21.35°N 157.964°W	Three 600-foot (180 m) towers dismantled in 1936. Transmitters moved to Lualualei in 1936
NPL Chollas Heights	San Diego, California	USA	30.6 kHz	32.74063°N 117.0643°W	ceased operations in 1992, towers demolished 1995, Transmitter building remains
Sayville Telefunken Wireless Station	Sayville, New York	USA	38.4 kHz	40.7437°N 73.1033°W	477-foot (145 m) tower demolished. massive concrete guy wire anchors remain.
Karlsborg transmitter	Karlsborg	Sweden	49.55 kHz	58.4870111°N 14.4691833°E	Two 689-foot (210 m) masts demolished in 2001
NAA Arlington	Arlington, Virginia	USA	50.0 kHz etc	38.867820°N 77.0791°W	towers removed in 1941, NAA buildings remain.
RKS Liblice 1 (OMA)	Liblice	Czech	50.0 kHz	50.072249°N 14.880810°E	demolished in 2004
OLB5	Poděbrady	Czech	50.0 kHz	50.137793°N 15.144331°E	shutdown in 1995
FTA50	Saint-André-de-Corcy	France	50.75 kHz	45.928825°N 4.935737°E	demolished
Hürup Navy Transmitter	Hürup	Germany	53 kHz; 68,9 kHz	54.760504°N 9.549544°E	3 masts, each 160 metres tall, shut-down in 2002
Neuharlingersiel Navy Transmitter	Neuharlingersiel	Germany	53 kHz	53.677881°N 7.612077°E	3 masts, two 164 metres tall and one 171 metres tall, since 2004 no VLF/LF-transmissions
Clifden Marconi Transmitter	Derrigimlagh, Clifden	Ireland	54.5 kHz	53.4508506°N 10.0430238°W	demolished following an attack by Irish republican forces in July 1922. Ruins remain
Bad Deutsch-Altenburg transmitter	Bad Deutsch-Altenburg	Austria	73.85 kHz	48.106176°N 16.920359°E	Three 100 metres tall masts, demolished in the 1980s
HBG	Prangins	Switzerland	75.0 kHz	46.408422°N 6.252680°E	Demolished 2012
Székesfehérvár transmitter	Székesfehérvár	Hungary	77.82 kHz	47.152844°N 18.395201°E	Two 152 metres masts demolished in 2009
Münchenbuchsee transmitter	Münchenbuchsee	Switzerland	82.05 kHz	47.014617°N 7.443483°E	One 125 metres and two 92 metres towers demolished in 1983
Dübendorf transmitter	Dübendorf	Switzerland		47.408820°N 8.631778°E	122 metres tall mast, demolished
Globecom Tower (XPH)	Thule	Greenland	68.9 kHz	76.553133°N 68.5507134°W	1,241-foot (378 m) tower was the tallest structure outside the USA in 1954. Demolished in 1992
Radom longwave transmitter (SOA, SNA)	Radom - Wacyn	Poland	55.75; 58.25; 62.45; 64.9; 76.35; 80.5; 81.35 kHz	51.409332°N 21.117214°E	shut-down, one mast today used for FM-/TV-broadcasting, the others demolished
Transatlantycka Radiotelegraficzna Centrala Nadawcza (AXO, AXL)	Babice, Warsaw	Poland	14.29; 16.4; 17.7; 18.65 kHz	52.266412°N 20.879892°E	Alexanderson alternator, destroyed on January 16, 1945 by the army of Nazi Germany
Eilvese	Eilvese	Germany	20; 30; 96 kHz	52.546389°N 9.414722°E	820-foot (250 m) tower demolished in 1931
Königs Wusterhausen	Königs Wusterhausen	Germany	69.7 kHz	52.304277°N 13.611326°E	demolished
Kamina Funkstation	Kamina, Atakpamé	Togo		7.933333°N 0.85°E	destroyed
Herzogstand	Herzogstand	Germany		47.628889°N 11.322222°E	experimental station, valley-span antenna, demolished
Goliath	Kalbe	Germany	16.55 kHz	52.669218°N 11.421890°E	removed by Russian troops, reinstalled in Russia as RJH90
Nauen Transmitter Station	Nauen	Germany		52.647959°N 12.908292°E	872-foot (266 m) tower demolished and all equipment removed by Soviet Army in 1946, transmitter building remains
SRC	Ruda	Sweden	44.2; 40.0 kHz	57.120331°N 16.153111°E	659 foot, 201-metre tall mast, demolished 2020
Lafayette Radio Station	Marcheprime	France		44.708611°N 0.813611°W	destroyed by retreating German troops in 1944
Basse-Lande transmitter	Brains	France		47.170749°N 1.694947°W	destroyed

== See also ==
- Communication with submarines
