= JXN =

JXN may refer to:

- Jackson County Airport (Michigan)
- Jackson station (Michigan)
- Noviken VLF Transmitter, a NATO transmitter in Norway
- JXN (musician), an Australian musician
