= Grimeton Radio Station =

Historic Swedish wireless telegraphy station

- Grimeton Radiostation (Swedish)
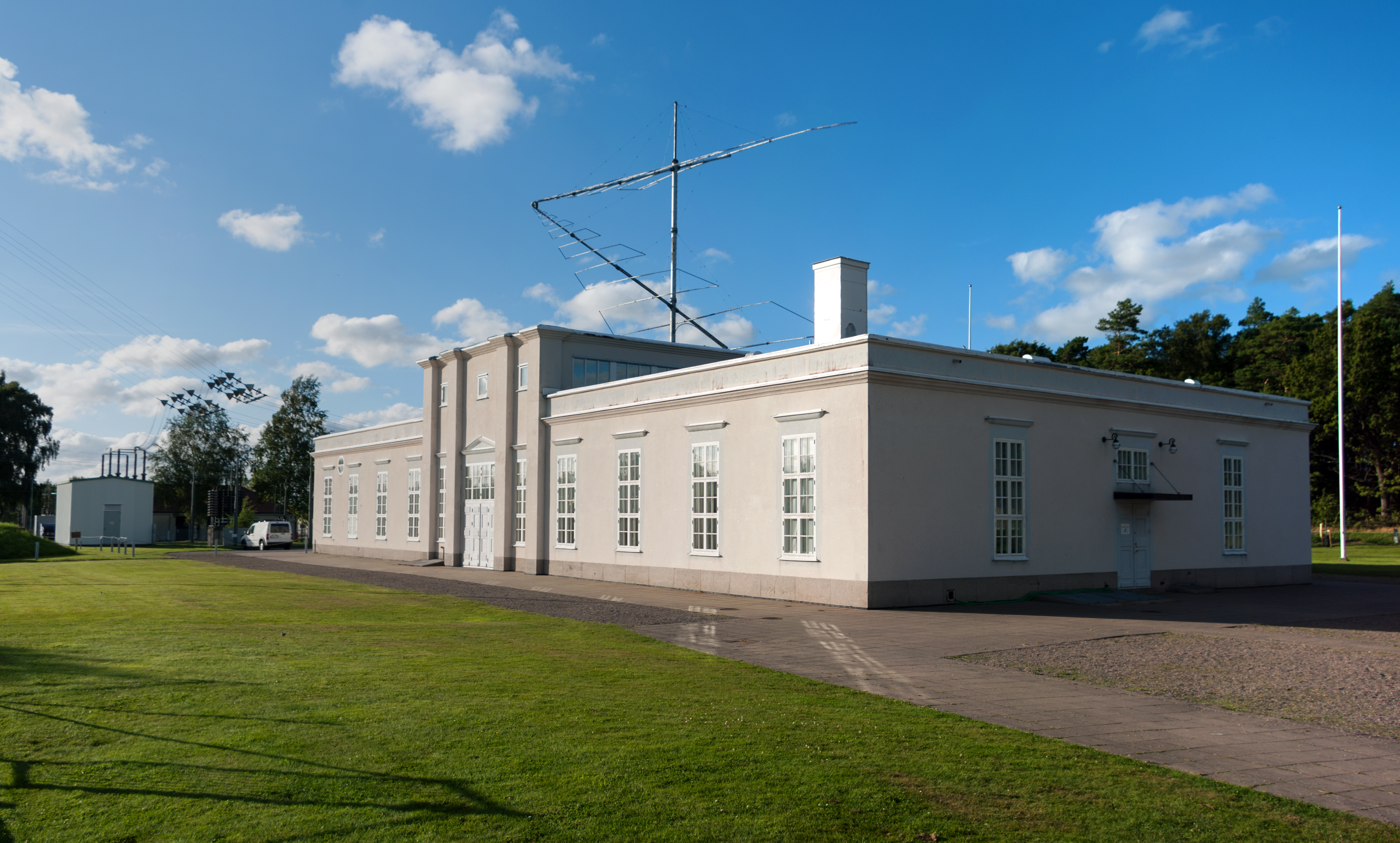
- The main building with a log-periodic antenna from the 1960s in the background.
- Interactive fullscreen map

General information
- Architectural style: Nordic Classicism
- Location: Grimeton, Varberg Municipality, Halland County, Sweden
- Coordinates: 57°6′50.4″N 12°24′15.8″E
- Construction started: 2 November 1922
- Completed: 24 May 1925
- Opened: 1 December 1924
- Inaugurated: 2 July 1925
- Owner: Stiftelsen Världsarvet Grimeton

Website
- grimeton.org

UNESCO World Heritage Site
- Official name: Grimeton Radio Station, Varberg
- Criteria: Cultural: ii, iv
- Reference: 1134
- Inscription: 2004 (28th Session)
- Area: 109.09 ha (269.6 acres)
- Buffer zone: 3,854 ha (9,520 acres)

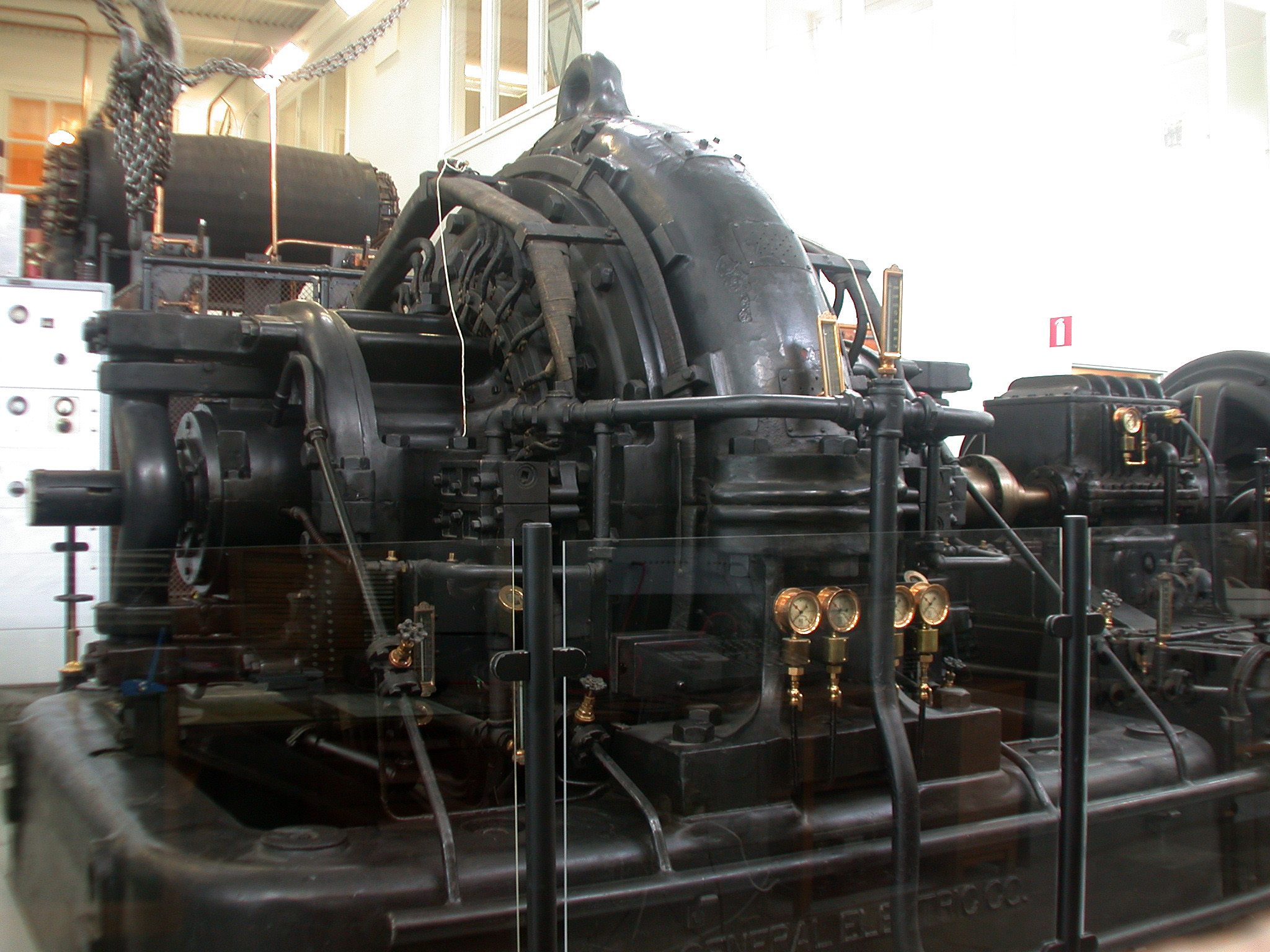
Alexanderson alternator in the Grimeton VLF transmitter. The drive motor is at the extreme right; the speed-increaser gearbox is just to its left. Note the bronze-colored shaft coupling.

Grimeton Radio Station (Swedish pronunciation: [ˈɡrɪ̂mːɛˌtɔn]) in southern Sweden, close to Varberg in Halland, is an early longwave transatlantic wireless telegraphy station built in 1922–1924, that has been preserved as a historical site.

Beginning in the 1920s, it was used for wireless communications to North America and other countries, and during World War II was one of Sweden's few telecommunication links to the rest of the world. It is home to the only remaining example of an early pre-electronic radio transmitter technology called an Alexanderson alternator. It was added to the UNESCO World Heritage List in 2004, with the statement: "Grimeton Radio Station, Varberg is an exceptionally well preserved example of a type of telecommunication centre, representing the technological achievements by the early 1920s, as well as documenting the further development over some three decades."

The radio station is also an anchor site for the European Route of Industrial Heritage. The transmitter is still in operational condition, and each year on a day called Alexanderson Day is started up and transmits brief Morse code test transmissions, which can be received all over Europe.

== History ==
Beginning around 1910 industrial countries built networks of powerful transoceanic longwave radiotelegraphy stations to communicate telegraphically with other countries. During the First World War radio became a strategic technology when it was realized that a nation without long-distance radio capability could be isolated from the rest of the world by an enemy cutting its submarine telegraph cables. Sweden's geographical dependence on other countries' underwater cable networks, and the temporary loss of those vital connections during the war, motivated a decision in 1920 by the Swedish Parliament that the Royal Telegraph Agency build a high-power radiotelegraphy station in Sweden to transmit telegram traffic across the Atlantic.

At the time, there were several different technologies used for high-power radio transmission, each owned by a different giant industrial company. Bids were requested from Telefunken in Berlin, The Marconi Company in London, Radio Corporation of America (RCA) in New York and Société Française Radio-Electrique in Paris. The transmitter chosen was the 200 kW version of the Alexanderson alternator, invented by Swedish-American Ernst Alexanderson, manufactured by General Electric and marketed by their subsidiary RCA. This consisted of a huge rotating electromechanical AC generator (alternator) turned by an electric motor at a fast enough speed that it generated radio frequency alternating current, which was applied to the antenna.

It was one of the first transmitters to generate sinusoidal continuous waves, which could communicate at longer range than the damped waves which were used by the earlier spark gap transmitters. The alternator was chosen because it was already used in most other transatlantic radio stations, reducing potential compatibility problems. The fact that it was designed by a Swede may have also played a part.

After careful calculations, the station was located in Grimeton, on the southwest coast of Sweden nearest North America, which allowed good radio wave propagation conditions over the North Atlantic to America, and also Norway, Denmark, and Scotland. The site was purchased in autumn 1922, construction began by the end of the year, and the station was finished in 1924. Two 200 kilowatt Alexanderson alternators were installed, to allow maintenance to be performed on one without interrupting radio traffic.

To achieve daytime communication over such long distances, transoceanic stations took advantage of an earth-ionosphere waveguide mechanism which required them to transmit at frequencies in the very low frequency (VLF) range below 30 kHz. Radio transmitters required extremely large antennas to radiate these long waves efficiently. The Grimeton station was equipped with a huge multiple-tuned flattop antenna 2.2 km (1.3 miles) long consisting of twelve (later reduced to eight) wires supported on six 127 m (417 foot) high steel towers, fed at one end by vertical feeder wires extending up from the transmitter building. The station started operation on 1 December 1924, transmitting radiotelegraphy traffic with the callsign SAQ on a wavelength of about 18,000 metres (16.7 kHz), later changed to 17,440 metres (17.2 kHz), to RCA's receiving station in Riverhead, New York. It immediately took over 95% of the Swedish telegram traffic to the United States.

The Alexanderson alternator technology was becoming obsolete even as it was installed. Vacuum tube electronic oscillator transmitters, which used the triode vacuum tube invented by Lee De Forest in 1907, replaced most pre-electronic transmitters in the early 1920s. However the large capital investment in an alternator transmitter caused owners to keep these huge behemoths in use long after they were technologically obsolete. By the mid-1930s most transatlantic communication had switched to short wave transmissions, and, beginning in 1938, vacuum tube shortwave transmitters were installed in the main building, using dipole and rhombic antennas in a neighbouring field. The Alexanderson alternator found a second use as a naval transmitter to communicate with submarines, as VLF frequencies can penetrate a short distance into seawater.

During the Second World War 1939–1945, the station experienced a heyday, when it was one of Scandinavia's gateways to the outside world. Underwater communication cable connections had once again been quickly severed by nations at war and the radiotelegraphy transmissions were a link to the outside world. Several new transmitters were therefore added to the station. As users during the war included the Swedish Ministry for Foreign Affairs and various embassies and legations, the radio station’s transmissions were subject to interception by signals intelligence operations such as the British Y service.

Following the war, additional transmitters were installed and the number of destinations increased, reaching a peak in the 1950s when the station operated twelve shortwave transmitters and one electronic longwave transmitter (as well as the original Alexanderson system), maintaining traffic to some twenty countries in Europe, Asia and the Americas. By that point, the telegraphic transmissions had shifted from Morse code to radioteletype and the station also provided radiofax and radiotelephony services. In the early/mid-1950s, experimental FM and TV transmitter installations were made at the site, using the towers as antenna supports.

By the 1960s, many of the transmitters were beginning to show their age and were subsequently decommissioned, being replaced by more modern equipment. However, rather than refitting the original station building, a new facility was built in 1966 to house the new transmitters, a move which allowed for the preservation of the older equipment. Several new antennas were also erected in the mid-to-late 1960s, but these investments were relatively short-lived in their original context as they coincided with the move away from using fixed radio circuits for international communications in favour of satellites and new types of cables. Instead, focus would eventually shift to long-range maritime radio. Also, modern FM and TV transmitters were installed in the new facility, which has a 260 m high antenna support tower.

The system installed in the new facility in two installments during the mid-60s and early-70s consisted of eight 30 kW Telefunken SV2470 HF transmitters and one 100 kW Telefunken HF transmitter, together with one 40 kW Telefunken LF transmitter. All HF transmitters shared a common antenna park, consisting of rhombic, discone and log-periodic antennas. The HF system was designed for international point-to-point telegraph and telephone circuit, but already in the mid-70s they started to fall out of fashion, with the last remaining being the Shanghai, Tokyo and Buenos Aires HF circuits, which were closed in the late-70s and early-80s.

The transmitter set-up was then mostly used as a contingency back-up and for maritime HF services, air-ground radio and for SSB broadcasting trials. In the 1980s, the maritime radiotelex system MARITEX required more capacity, so several smaller HF and MF transmitters were added, sharing the antennas using diplex and triplexer filter networks. For a brief period in the 1990s the experimental aeronautical HF digital datalink (HFDL) system used the station as one of its transmitter sites. All pre-1980s LF and HF transmitters in the new building have since been decommissioned and scrapped.

The early 1990s saw the corporatisation of Televerket, the Swedish telecom agency, with its successor Telia taking ownership of the site, apart from the new station building which was sectioned off and transferred to Teracom.

== Preservation ==
The changed conditions meant that the future of the old radio station became much more uncertain as Telia was expected to streamline its operations. Various scenarios were considered, including the demolition of the six antenna towers. In stark contrast to this stood the potential preservation of the site as a museum and a historical monument, an idea which had been floated within the Swedish telecom agency already in the early 1970s but had not been realised. The extensive and much-needed restoration efforts this solution would require, and the related costs, were initially a source of hesitancy for the newly-formed Telia.

The potential loss of a landmark did however cause a rise in public interest and by the mid-1990s former employees, locals and other interested parties were working together with Telia and the county administrative board of Halland to ensure the radio station's continued existence. With funds received from the Swedish National Heritage Board, restoration could begin while the station's buildings and antenna towers became listed in 1996.

These efforts laid the groundwork for what would eventually result in the site's inscription on the World Heritage List. Based on its authenticity and integrity as a monument to early wireless communications, the decision to include the property was passed at the 28th session of the World Heritage Committee held in Suzhou in 2004.

In 2003, the ownership of the radio station was handed over to a foundation, Stiftelsen Världsarvet Grimeton, tasked with the management of the site. An association of volunteers, Alexander, contributes to the continued maintenance and operation of the Alexanderson transmitter. Having had a long history of being closed to the general public, the old radio station is nowadays open to visitors. To facilitate this purpose, a visitor center was built in 2005 and expanded ahead of the site's centennial celebrations in 2025.

The property remains a source of radio transmissions with the still operational Alexanderson transmitter being used for the transmission of telegrams on certain occasions, such as Alexanderson Day, United Nations Day and Christmas Eve, using its historical frequency of 17.2 kHz as well as its call sign SAQ. The site is also home to the HAM radio station SK6SAQ.

Commercial operations are also ongoing. The year 2000 saw the decommissioning of MARITEX, freeing up a large number of transmitters and antennas, which were then leased to the Globe Wireless system for maritime HF digital communications. When the Globe Wireless operations ceased in 2012, the HF antenna and feed-line system was re-purposed for air-ground voice HF services, following the decommissioning of and moving from their original Karlsborg transmitter site, which claim to be the only remaining civilian commercial user of the facilities. The Swedish Maritime Administration also leases transmitter and antenna spaces for MF telephony and NAVTEX transmitters at the site. Their NAVTEX antenna is of a special design, using one 127 m high tower as a folded monopole antenna, self-resonant on 518 kHz.

== Technical description ==
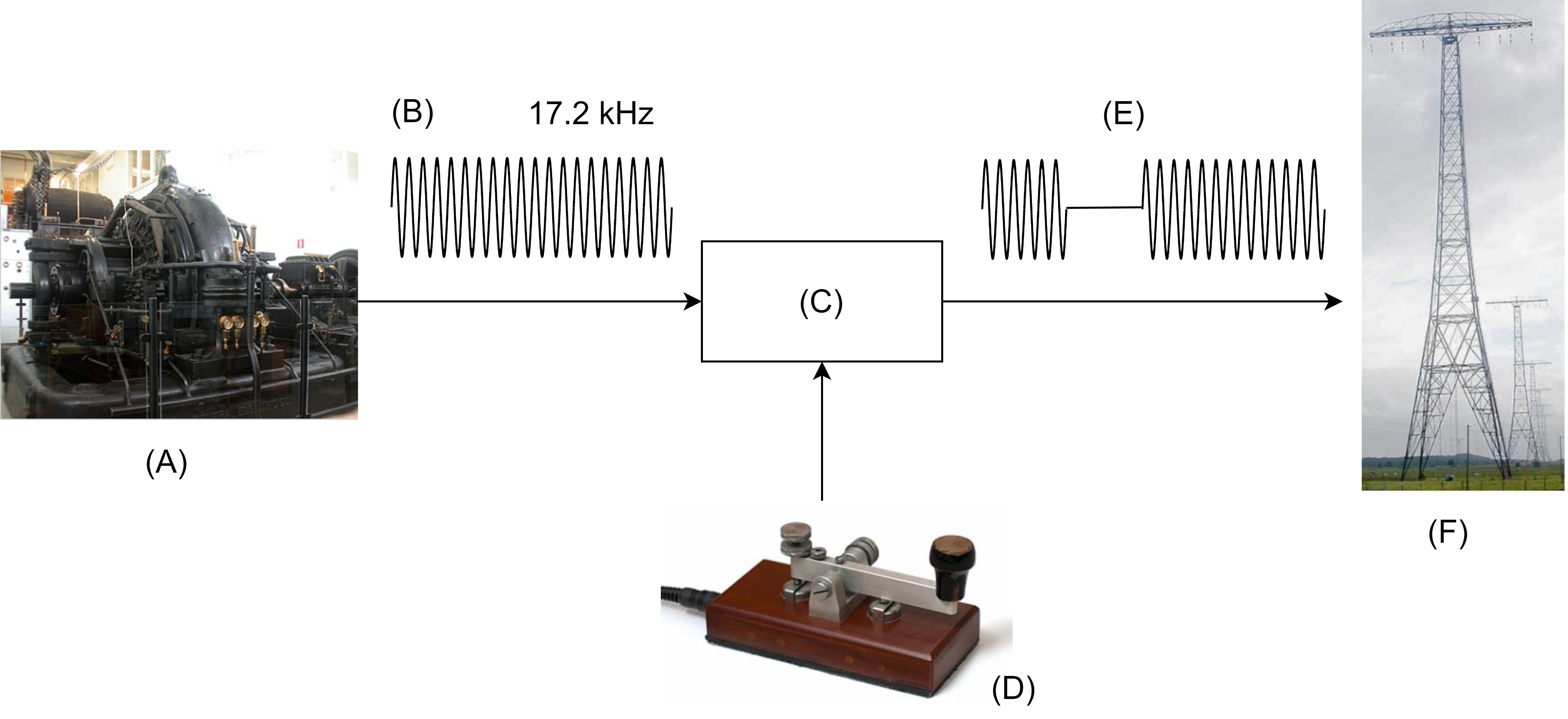
Principal diagram of information transmission

The electromechanical transmitter in Grimeton transmitted at a frequency of 17.2 kHz, i.e. in the VLF range, and was thus able to reach America.

In principle, an electric generator (A) is used for this purpose. This is set in rotation by a motor (500 HP, 711.3 rpm) via a gearbox (setup ratio: 2.97) and thus generates a continuous sinusoidal AC voltage (B) of 17.2 kHz or 17,200 Hz.

For comparison, generators of the public electricity networks produce an alternating voltage of 50 or 60 Hz, depending on the country. To produce such high frequencies with a generator, a fast-rotating generator (2115 revolutions per minute) with a special design is necessary.

In Grimeton, mainly Morse signals were transmitted. To send information with the generated alternating voltage, the texts to be sent are translated into a sequence of short and long pulses according to the Morse code by means of a Morse key (D). The switchgear (C) uses these pulses to control the transmission of the AC voltage to the antenna (F). When the key is pressed, the AC voltage is passed on to the antenna and transmitted from there. If the key is not pressed, the AC voltage is suppressed by the switchgear and no signal is transmitted. Thus, for example, as shown in (E), the letter A can be transmitted by a short and a long wave packet and detected at the receiver.

The AC voltage generated has a voltage of 2000 volts and a power of 200 kW (although these days it is usually limited to about 80 kW). Such strong signals cannot be switched on and off by a simple switch, since it would cause considerable arcing. In Grimeton, a different method was used for this purpose.

As known from historical radios, the antenna and the adjacent coils and capacitors form an resonant circuit, which must be tuned to the desired frequency so that the energy is optimally transmitted. In Grimeton, the tuning of this oscillating circuit is now disturbed in the switchgear (C) when the Morse key is not pressed, thus suppressing transmission. Thus it is possible to control an AC power of 200 kW with a small power (3 kW DC).

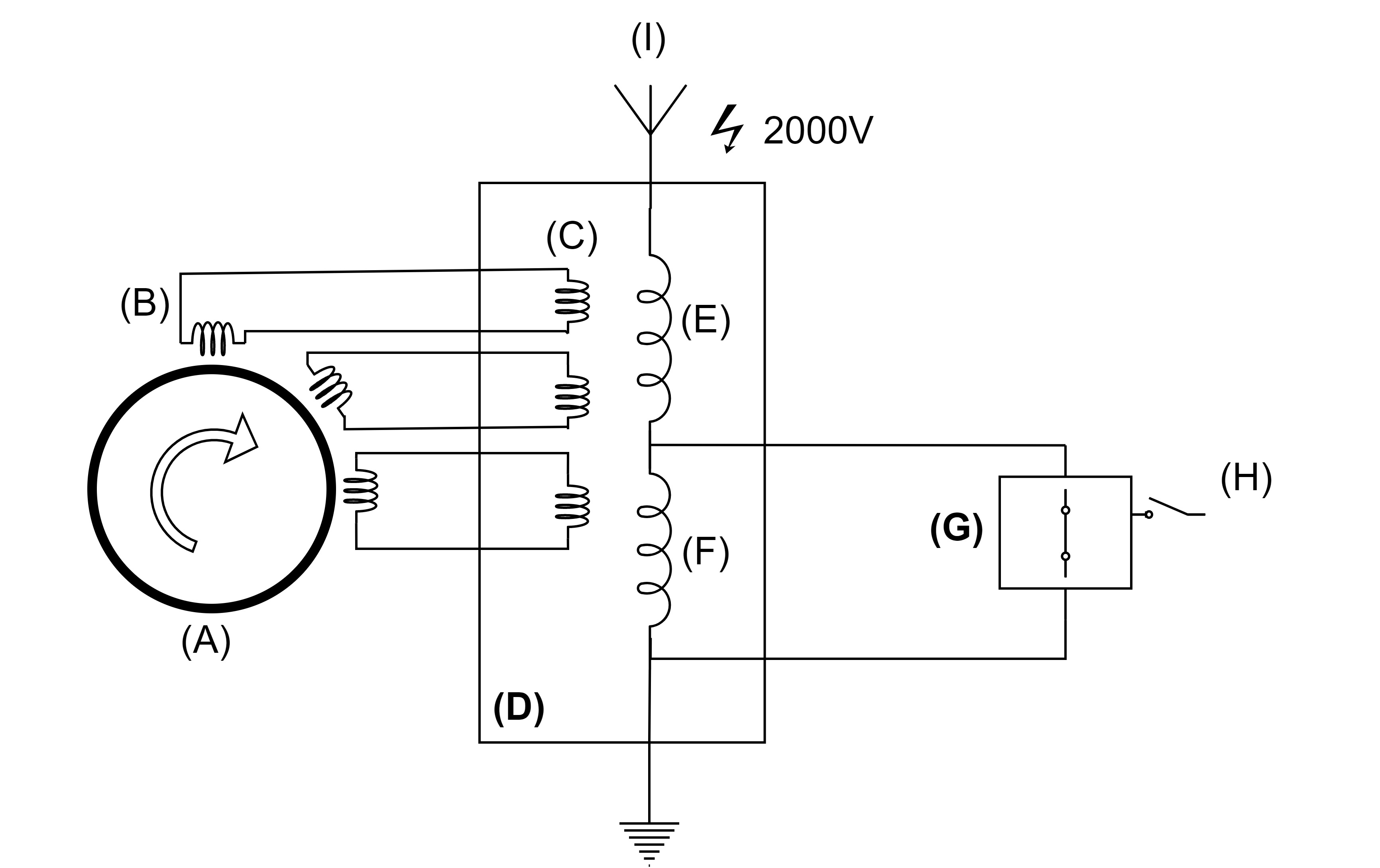
Resonant circuit consisting of antenna (I), transformer (D) and magnetic amplifier (G)

The antenna resonant circuit essentially consists of the antenna (I), a transformer (D) and a magnetic amplifier (G).

As usual in electric generators, an alternating voltage is generated in adjacent coils (B) in the generator (A) by means of rotating magnetic fields. In Grimeton, these coils are mounted on the stator, divided into 2x32 sectors, on both sides to the rotor. The individual windings of a sector are connected to corresponding primary windings (C) of the transformer (D). When the primary voltages are transmitted to the secondary winding (E) of the transformer, these voltages are superimposed to form a strong, sinusoidal output signal which is output to the antenna and transmitted.

The control winding (F) and the magnetic amplifier (G) are responsible for controlling the transmission process by the operator's Morse code key (H). The magnetic amplifier is an arrangement of coils and capacitors whose AC resistance is indirectly influenced by the Morse key and a DC source. When the Morse key is open, the solenoid amplifier short-circuits the control winding (F), to put it simply. The short-circuiting of (F) disturbs the transmitting oscillating circuit, so that finally no more than 9 % of the normal antenna current flows [2, page 53]. The situation described above (full transmit or no transmit at all) can therefore only be achieved approximately, but this is sufficient in practice.

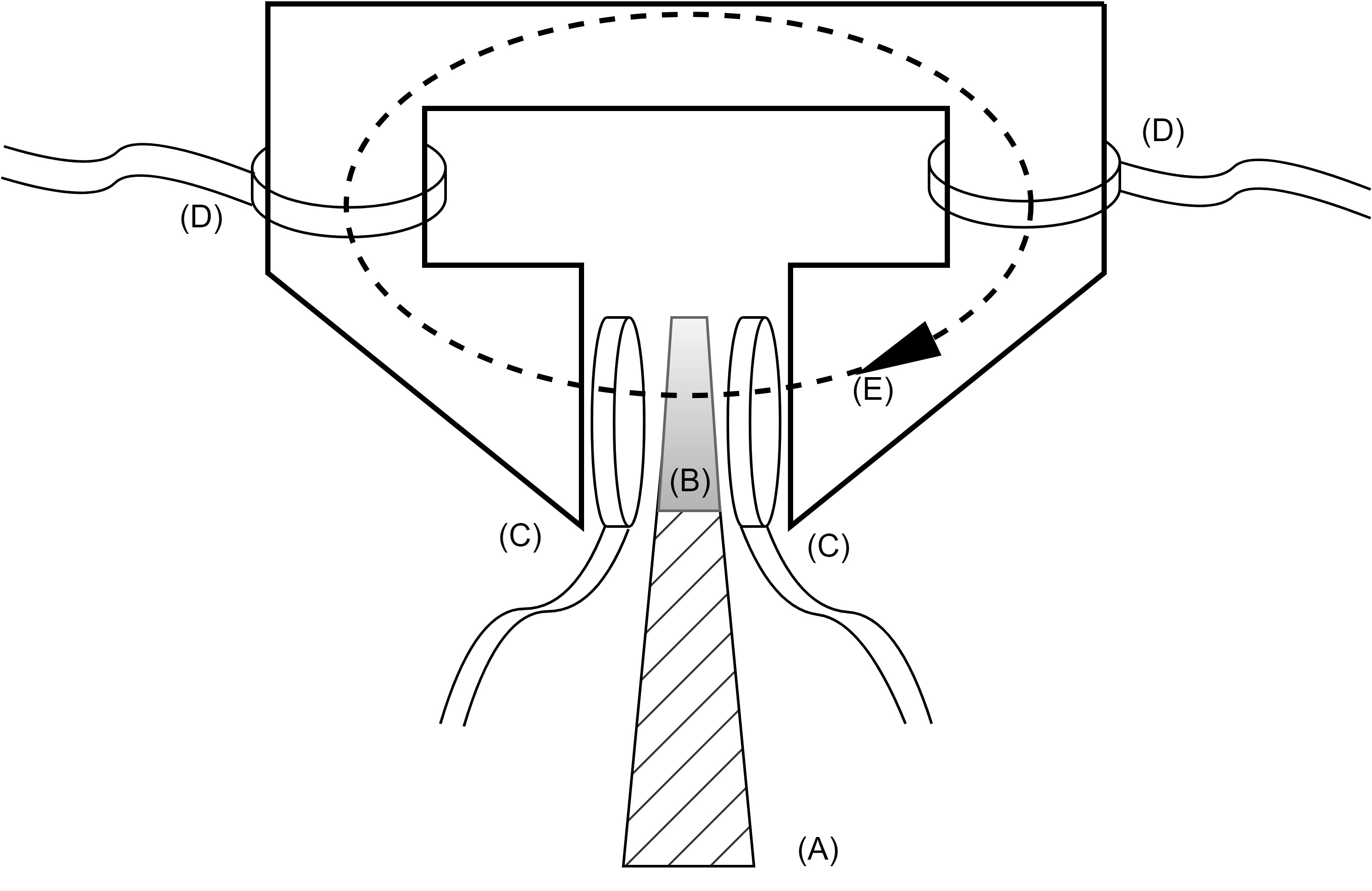
Principal sketch section through the generator (not to scale)

In order to achieve the necessary transmission frequency, the generator of the Alexanderson alternator type must not only rotate quickly, but it also needs a special construction with many magnetic poles. For this purpose, the magnetizable steel rotor disk (A) is provided at the edge with 488 slots (B), which are filled with a non-magnetic material. By means of the coils (D), a continuous magnetic field (E) is generated in the stator by means of direct current, in which the coils (C) are also located. Due to the rotating rotor disk, this magnetic field between the coils (C) is alternately reinforced by the steel disk and damped by the non-magnetic slots. This cyclically changing magnetic field induces a sinusoidal voltage in the coils (C).

The above sketch is not to scale; the air gap between rotor and stator frame is only 1 mm wide. The rotor is a steel disc measuring 1.6 m in diameter and approximately 7.5 cm thick at the periphery.

== Antenna system ==
To achieve maximum range, like other transoceanic radiotelegraphy stations of this era it transmitted in the very low frequency (VLF) band, at a frequency of 17.2 kilohertz and so the wavelength is approximately 17442 meters. Even though the antenna is approximately 2 km-long (1.2 mi), it is short compared with the wavelength and so it is not very efficient.

The antenna system consists of antenna wires supported by masts, such as those used for high-voltage power lines. The six antenna masts each have a 46 m cross-arm at the top and are 127 m high. Today they carry 8 antenna conductors although originally there were 12.

The multiple-tuned antenna used at Grimeton is a pre-WW1 invention by E F W Alexanderson, which uses a number of vertical radiator wires interconnected by the flat-top wires, which serve both as top capacitance and as a high-voltage transmission line.

Each vertical wire is terminated in a ground-mounted tuning inductance (or "coil") which serves to tune out the capacitive reactance of the wire, and to establish the proper phase relationship between the currents in the wires.

By dividing the total current flowing into the ground or counterpoise system between several connection points, the equivalent ground loss resistance may be substantially reduced compared to the case when all current is fed into a single vertical radiator. This increases the antenna efficiency by about an order of magnitude.

== Gallery ==
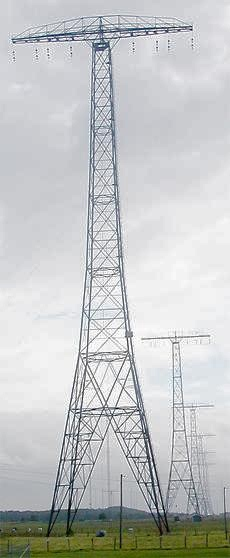
1900 meter (1.2 mile) flattop antenna

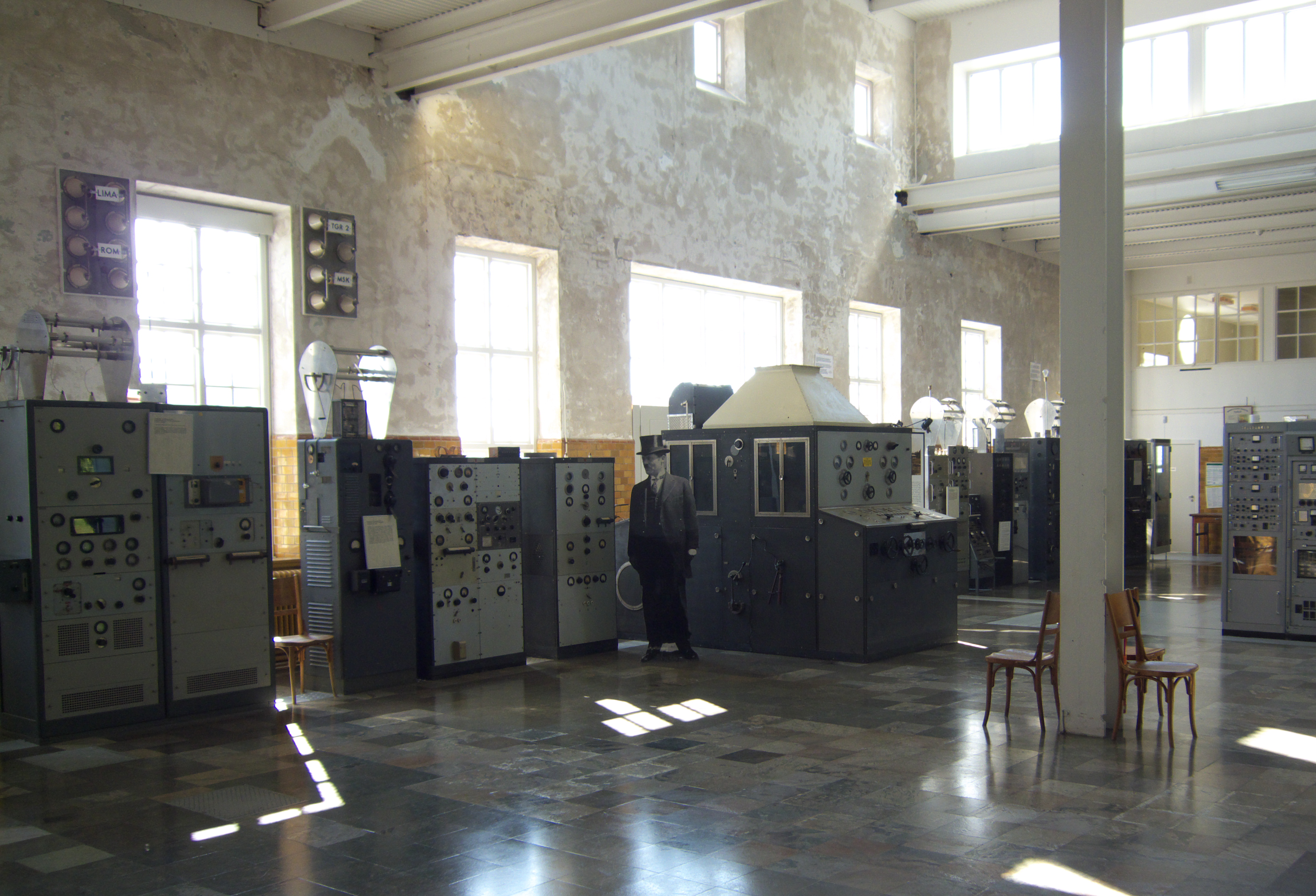
Interior of Grimeton radio station

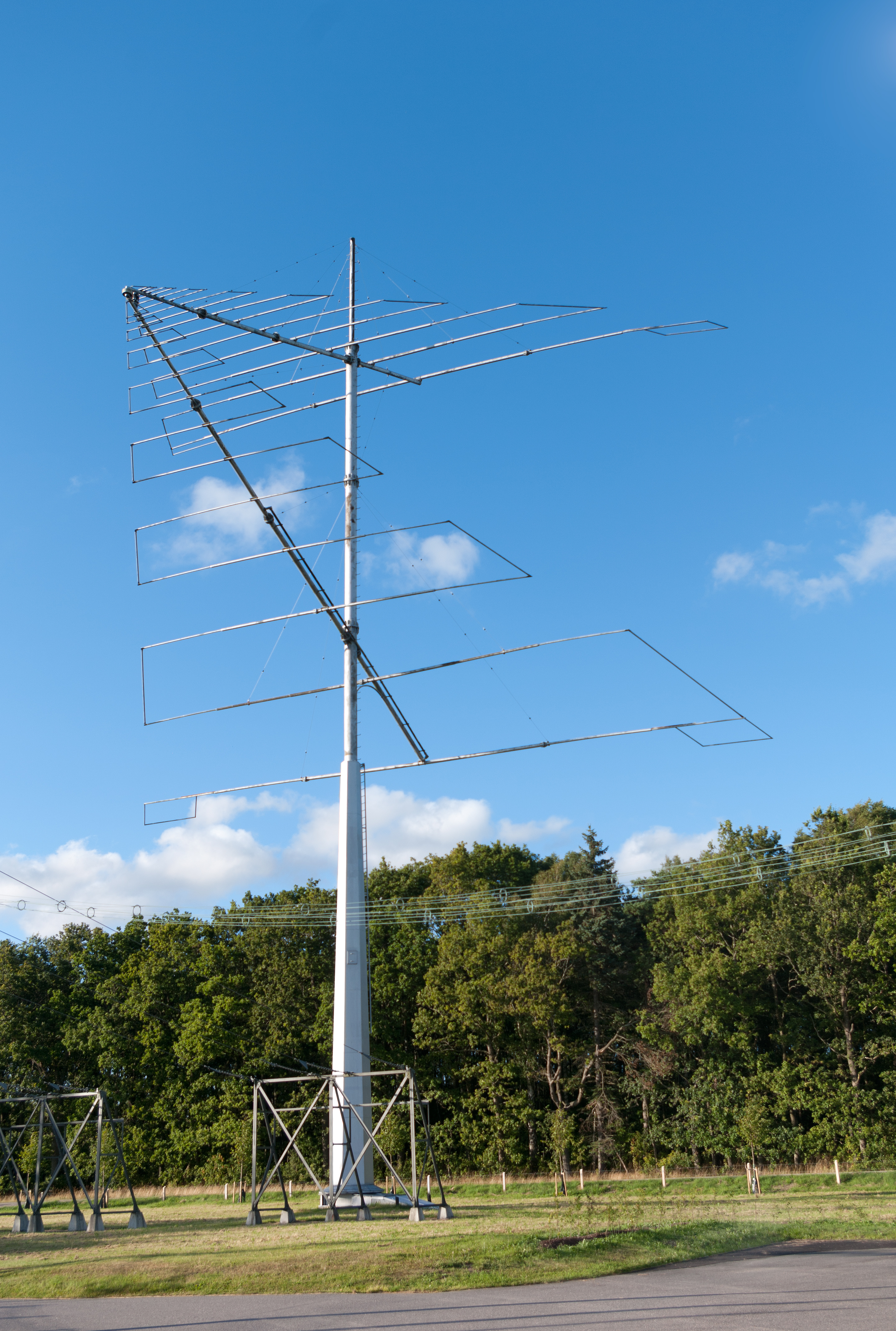
A Rohde & Schwarz AK 226/441 log-periodic shortwave antenna by the transmitter building

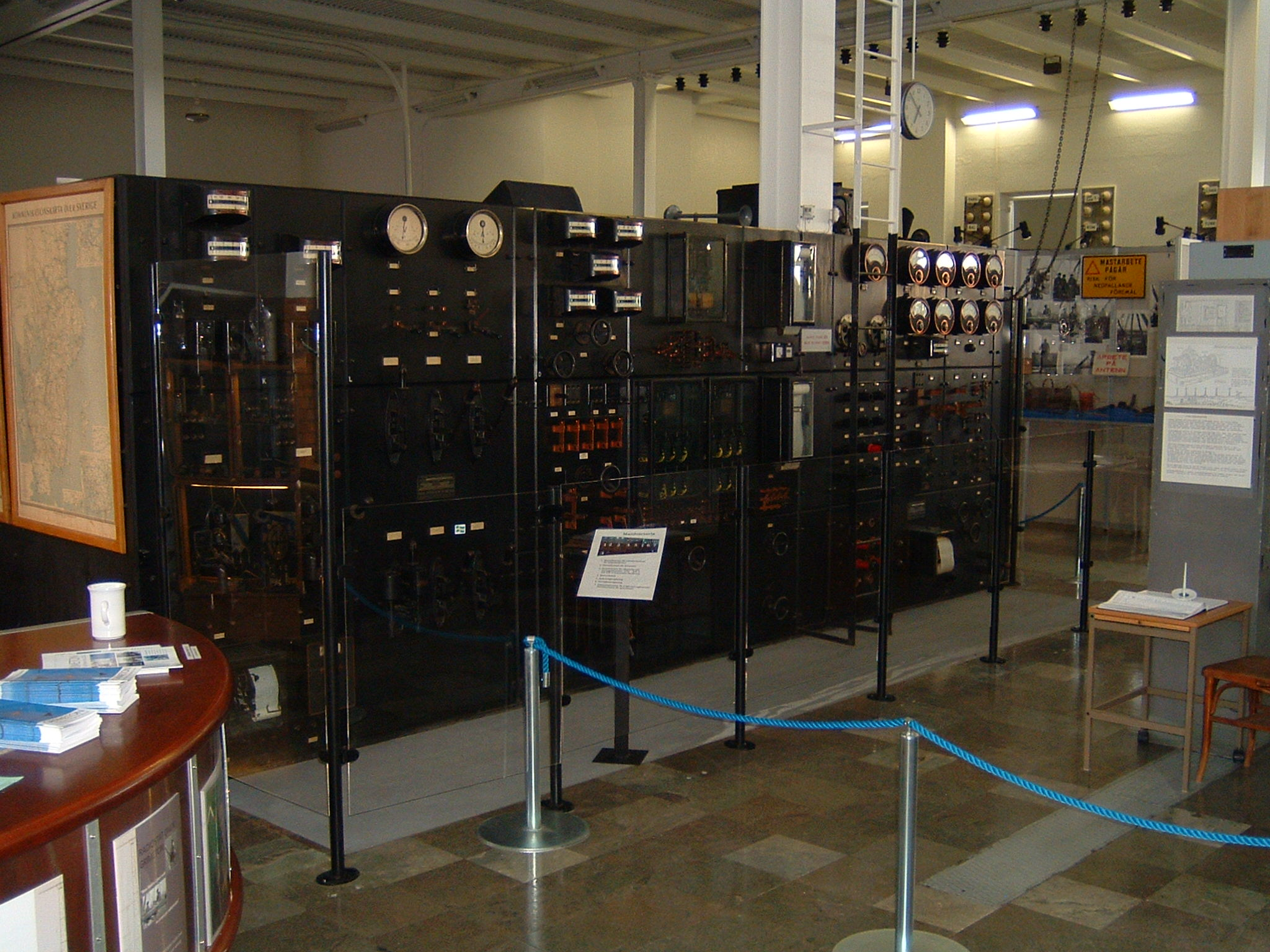
Interior of transmitter hall showing control panel for alternator

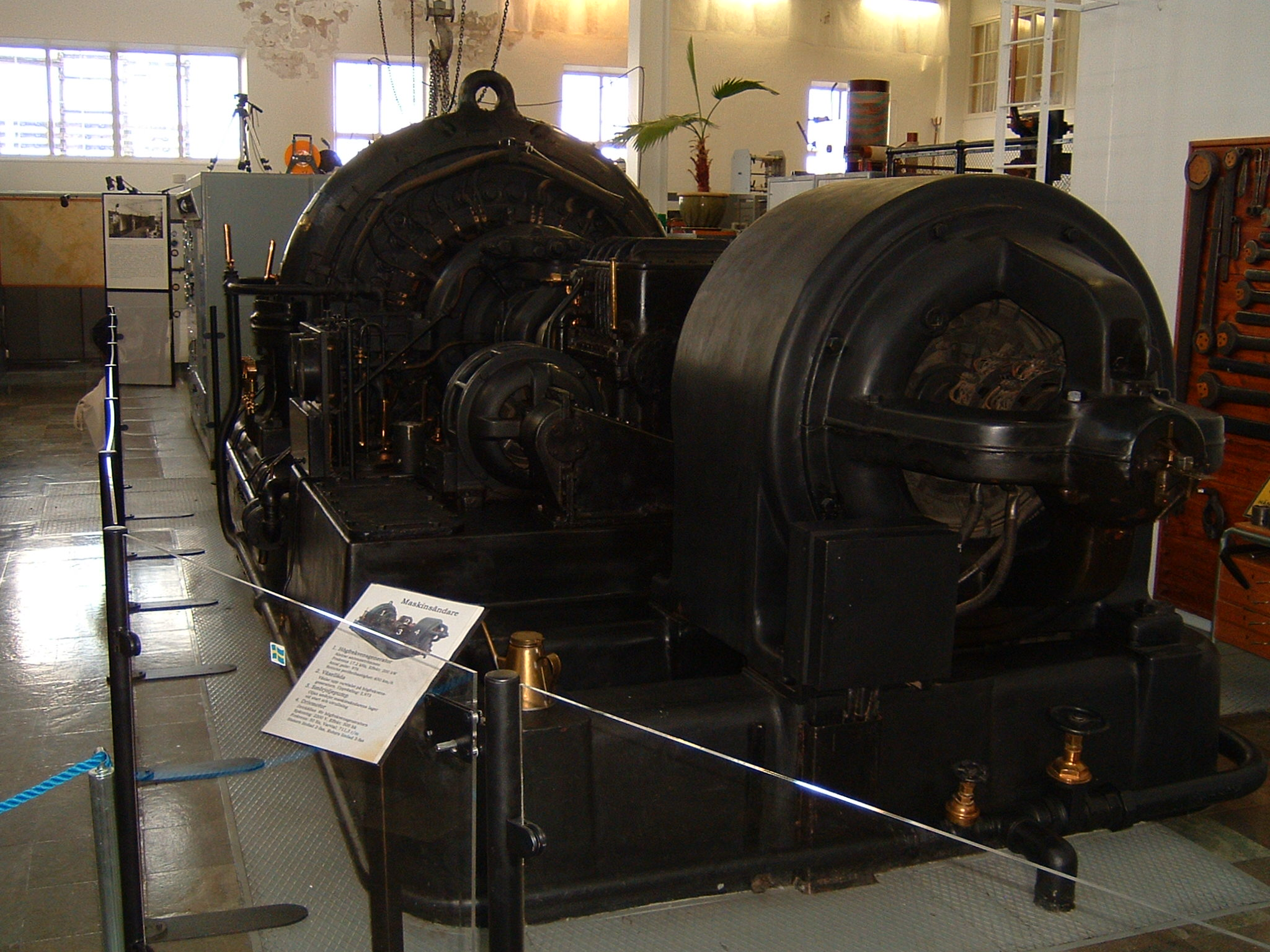
Interior of transmitter hall showing Alexanderson alternator

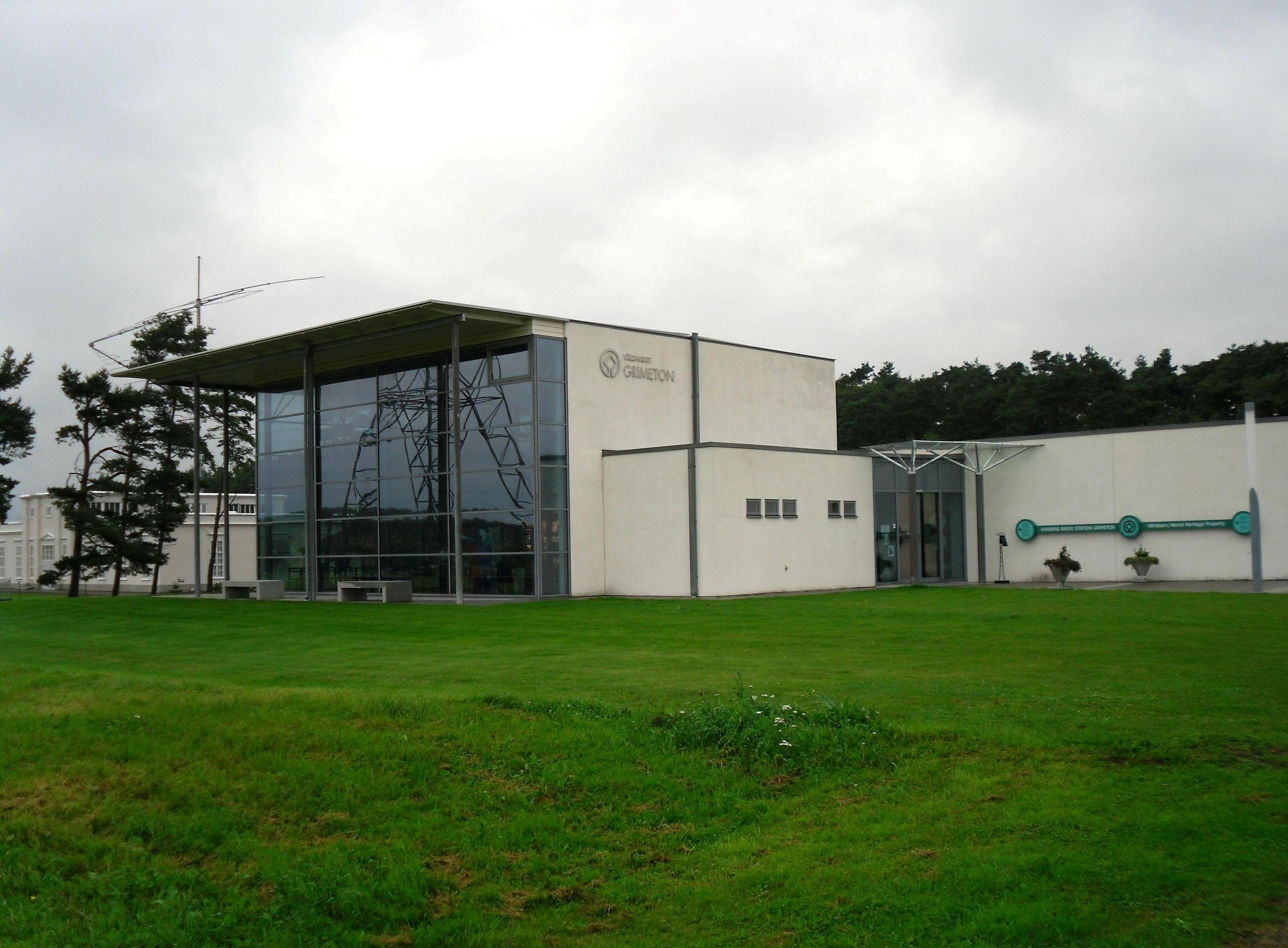
The site's visitor center

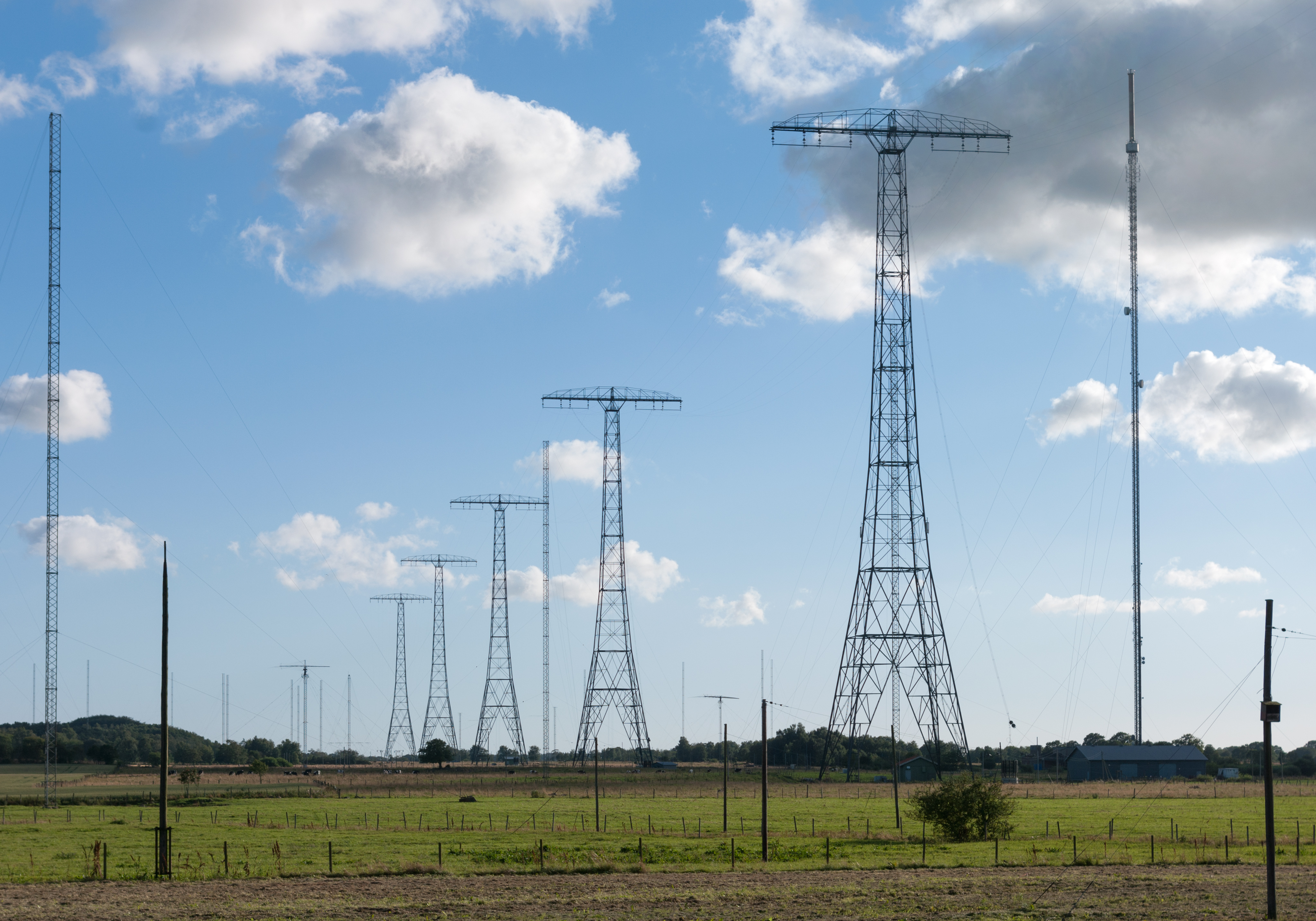
Part of the site's antenna farm

== See also ==
Comparable transmitter stations

- Monte Grande Radio Station, Argentina
- Belradio Transmitter Station, Belgium
- Poděbrady Transmitter Station, Czechoslovakia
- Nauen Transmitter Station, Germany
- Yosami Transmitting Station, Japan
- Radio Kootwijk, Netherlands
- Malabar Radio Station, Dutch East Indies
- Stavanger Transmitter Station, Norway
- Babice Radio Station, Poland
- Oktyabrsky Radio Center, Soviet Union
- Rugby Radio Station, United Kingdom
- Kahuku Marconi Station, United States
- New Brunswick Marconi Station, United States

Related lists

- List of masts
- List of towers
- List of VLF transmitters
