= Herzogstand =

Mountain in Bavaria, Germany

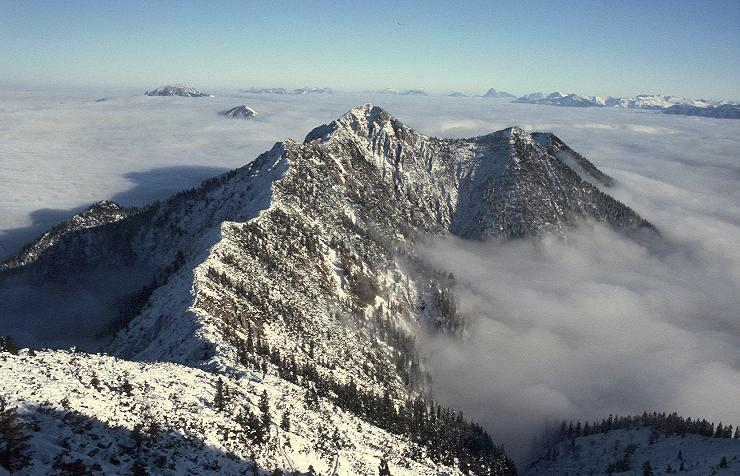
- Herzogstand from Heimgarten

Highest point
- Elevation: 1,731 m (5,679 ft)
- Coordinates: 47°36′49.2″N 11°18′27.6″E

Geography
- Location within Germany
- Location: Bavaria, Germany
- Parent range: Bavarian Prealps

The Herzogstand is a mountain in the Bavarian foothills of the Alps, 75 kilometres (47 mi) south of the city of Munich. It has an elevation of 1,731 metres (5,679 ft) and is northwest of Lake Walchen. Maximilian II of Bavaria had a hunting lodge built underneath today's so-called Herzogstand-house in 1857. His successor, King Ludwig II, had a royal lodge built further up the mountain in 1865. The Herzogstand Cable Car renewed in 1994 following a fire in 1992, runs to Herzogstand-house at 1,575 metres (5,167 ft) above sea level, and then continues on to the summit of Farnkopf at 1,627 metres (5,338 ft).

The most popular ascent (AV way 446) leads from the valley station of the aerial tramway across the south side to Herzogstand-house and on to the summit of the mountain. An alternative descent leads along the somewhat exposed but well-secured ridge to the Heimgarten mountain (1,790 metres/5,870 ft), passing a lodge to the south of the Ohlstaedter Alm (1,423 metres/4,669 ft). The descent east of the Rotwandkopf continues down to the spa town of Walchensee (Kochel).

== Cable car ==
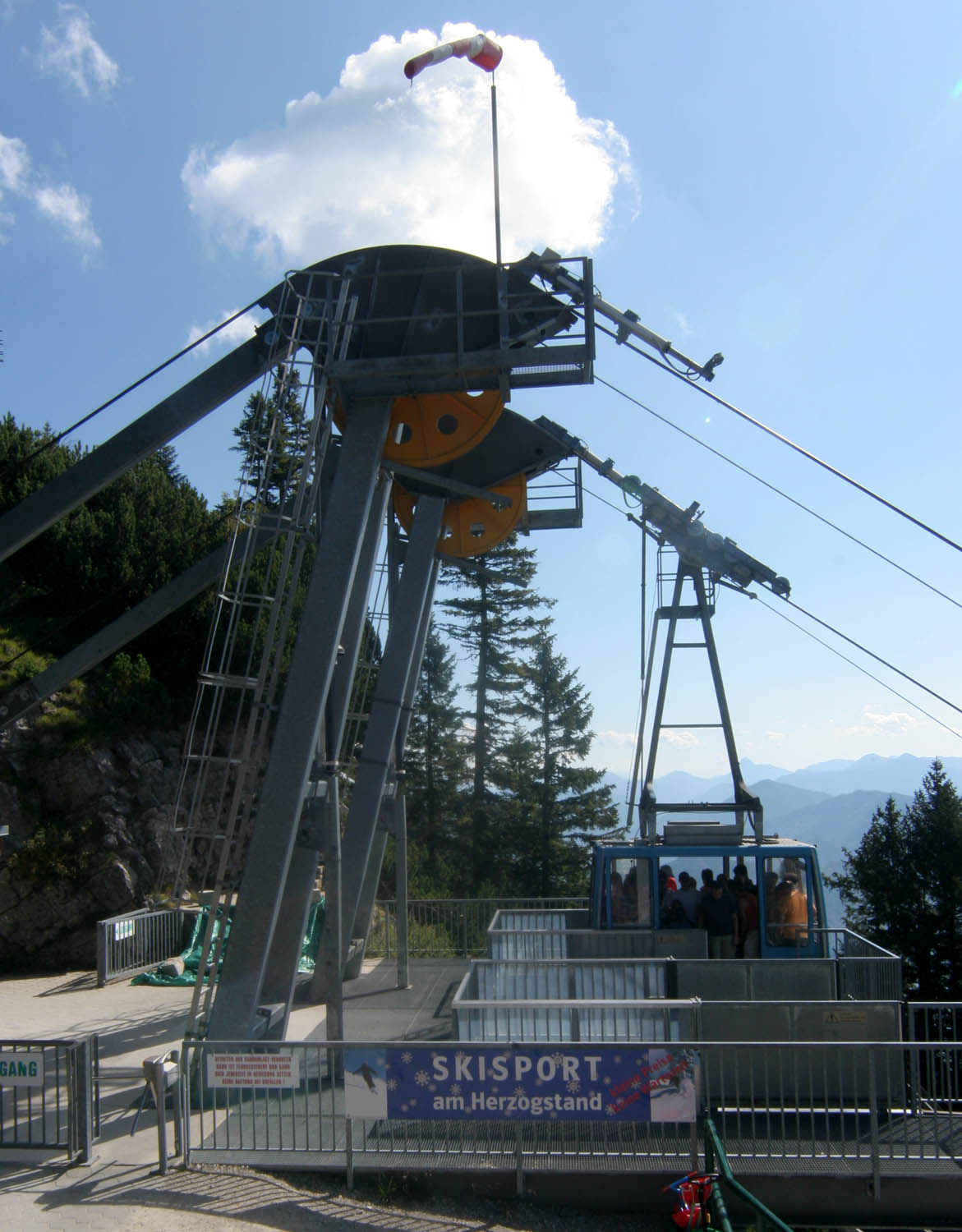
Upper terminus of the Herzogstandbahn

The Herzogstand Cable Car (German: Herzogstandbahn) was built in 1994 as replacement for a 4,500-foot (1,400 m) chair lift through the Bavarian alps. Its two cabins carry passengers from the village of Walchensee (800 metres/2,600 ft above NN) to the Fahrenberg mountain (1,600 metres/5,200 ft above NN) on the upper slopes of the Herzogstand mountain. The cableway uses a 43 mm (1.7 in) carrying cable and a 21 mm (0.83 in) hauling cable. The cable car is driven by a 185 kilowatt engine. The cable way has two supports, which are 28 metres (92 ft) and 24 metres (79 ft) high. The journey time each way is four minutes and the cars reach a top speed of 8 metres per second (18 mph).

== Transmitter ==
The summit of Herzogstand has been used since 1920 for radiotechnical purposes; a VLF transmission antenna was erected between 1920 and 1934. Today, an FM radio transmitter on Fahrenbergkopf broadcasts the following stations:

| Frequency | Program | ERP |
|---|---|---|
| 88.1 MHz | Bayern 1 (Reg. Obb.) | 0,1 kW |
| 91.0 MHz | Bayern 3 | 0,1 kW |
| 97.0 MHz | Bayern 2 (Reg. Obb.) | 0,1 kW |
| 99.9 MHz | Radio Alpenwelle | 0,1 kW |
| 102.0 MHz | Antenne Bayern | 0,1 kW |
| 104.1 MHz | 4 Klassik | 0,1 kW |
| 104.6 MHz | Radio Oberland | 0,1 kW |
| 106.7 MHz | B 5 aktuell | 0,1 kW |

Herzogstand was the site of Germany's first ionospheric sounding station in 1929. It operated until the end of World War II, when a mistranslated telegram seemed to request the relocation of its equipment. Later, it was discovered that the request was for a 'typical German record' and not their 'typical German recorder.'

== See also ==
- Herzogstand Radio Station
