= Beta (time signal) =

Time signal radio station in Russia

Beta is a time signal service in the VLF range in Russia, operated by the Russian Navy. It is controlled by All-Russian Scientific Research Institute for Physical-Engineering and Radiotechnical Metrology. There are 6 transmitter stations, which take turns transmitting time signals and other communications.

Each transmitter has 1 or 2 scheduled sessions per day lasting 31–41 minutes, depending on transmitter, total 8 sessions in 24 hours. Beginning on the hour is 15–20 minutes of 25.0 kHz, including morse code station identification and time code. This is followed by 3- or 4-minute intervals of 25.1, 25.5, 23.0 and 20.5 kHz of unmodulated carrier precisely phase-locked to UTC(SU) time scale. No time code is sent during the last quarter of an hour.

== The Beta network ==
Beta consists of the following transmitters:

| Callsign | Transmitter Location | 20.5 kHz | 23.0 kHz | 25.0 kHz | 25.1 kHz | 25.5 kHz | Coordinates |
|---|---|---|---|---|---|---|---|
| RJH63 | Krasnodar | x | x | x | x | x | 44.773537°N 39.547241°E |
| RJH69 | Vileyka VLF transmitter near Maladzyechna (Belarus) | x | x | x | x | x | 54.462356°N 26.769218°E |
| RJH77 | Arkhangelsk | x | x | x | x | x | 64.360491°N 41.568489°E |
| RJH86 | Bishkek (Kyrgyzstan) | x | x | x | x | x | 43.039444°N 73.6125°E |
| RJH90 | Nizhny Novgorod (former German Goliath transmitter) | x | x | x | x | x | 56.171945°N 43.931667°E |
| RAB99 | Khabarovsk | x | x | x | x | x | 48.485550°N 134.823330°E |

== Frequency usage ==
The time code consists of a series of signals on multiple frequencies. Transmission starts on the hour. Each time a new frequency is selected, there is 1 minute of low power while the transmitter is adjusted, then full-power transmissions begin.

The transmitters are estimated to operate at 1000 kW, achieving 30–50 kW EIRP. (The difference is due to the low efficiency of antennas at this frequency, which must be much smaller than the 12 km wavelength.)

Beta hourly transmission schedule
| Frequency | Minutes | | Signal |
| Frequency | Start | Duration | Signal |
|---|---|---|---|
| 25.0 kHz | :00 | 1 | Transmitter tune-up, low-power unmodulated carrier |
| 25.0 kHz | :01 | 5 | Unmodulated carrier |
| 25.0 kHz | :06 | 1 | Morse code call sign, on-off keying |
| 25.0 kHz | :07 | 3 | Unmodulated carrier |
| 25.0 kHz | :10 | 3 | On-off modulated with 40 Hz square wave |
| 25.0 kHz | :13 | 9 | Time code, on-off modulation |
| 25.0 kHz | :22 | 3 | On-off modulated with 40 Hz square wave |
| 25.1 kHz | :25 | 1 | Transmitter tune-up, low-power unmodulated carrier |
| 25.1 kHz | :26 | 4 | Unmodulated carrier |
| 25.5 kHz | :30 | 1 | Transmitter tune-up, low-power unmodulated carrier |
| 25.5 kHz | :31 | 4 | Unmodulated carrier |
| 23.0 kHz | :35 | 1 | Transmitter tune-up, low-power unmodulated carrier |
| 23.0 kHz | :36 | 5 | Unmodulated carrier |
| 20.5 kHz | :41 | 1 | Transmitter tune-up, low-power unmodulated carrier |
| 20.5 kHz | :42 | 5 | Unmodulated carrier |
| Off | :47 | | Transmission ends |

The time code consists of a series of carrier pulses:

- Each 100 ms, a 25 ms burst of carrier is transmitted
- Each second, a 100 ms burst of carrier is transmitted
- Each 10 s, a 1 s burst of carrier is transmitted
- Each minute, a 10 s burst of carrier is transmitted

The hour or date is not coded.

Most of the stations were built in the 1970s. RJH63 and RAB99, built later, has a different transmission:

RJH63 and RAB99 hourly transmission schedule
| Frequency | Minutes | | Signal |
| Frequency | Start | Duration | Signal |
|---|---|---|---|
| 25.0 kHz | :00 | 1 | Transmitter tune-up, low-power unmodulated carrier |
| 25.0 kHz | :01 | 5 | Unmodulated carrier |
| 25.0 kHz | :06 | 1 | Morse code call sign, on-off keying |
| 25.0 kHz | :07 | 2 | Unmodulated carrier |
| 25.0 kHz | :09 | 2 | On-off modulated with 40 Hz square wave |
| 25.0 kHz | :11 | 9 | Time code, on-off modulation |
| 25.1 kHz | :20 | 2 | Transmitter tune-up, low-power unmodulated carrier |
| 25.1 kHz | :22 | 1 | Unmodulated carrier |
| 25.5 kHz | :23 | 1 | Transmitter tune-up, low-power unmodulated carrier |
| 25.5 kHz | :24 | 2 | Unmodulated carrier |
| 23.0 kHz | :26 | 1 | Transmitter tune-up, low-power unmodulated carrier |
| 23.0 kHz | :27 | 4 | Unmodulated carrier |
| 20.5 kHz | :31 | 1 | Transmitter tune-up, low-power unmodulated carrier |
| 20.5 kHz | :32 | 4 | Unmodulated carrier |
| 20.5 kHz | :36 | 4 | (RJH63 only) Digital data, ±50 Hz frequency-shift keying, 50 baud |
| Off | :40 | | Transmission ends |

== See also ==
- RWM
