= Alexanderson Day =

Swedish commemorative holiday

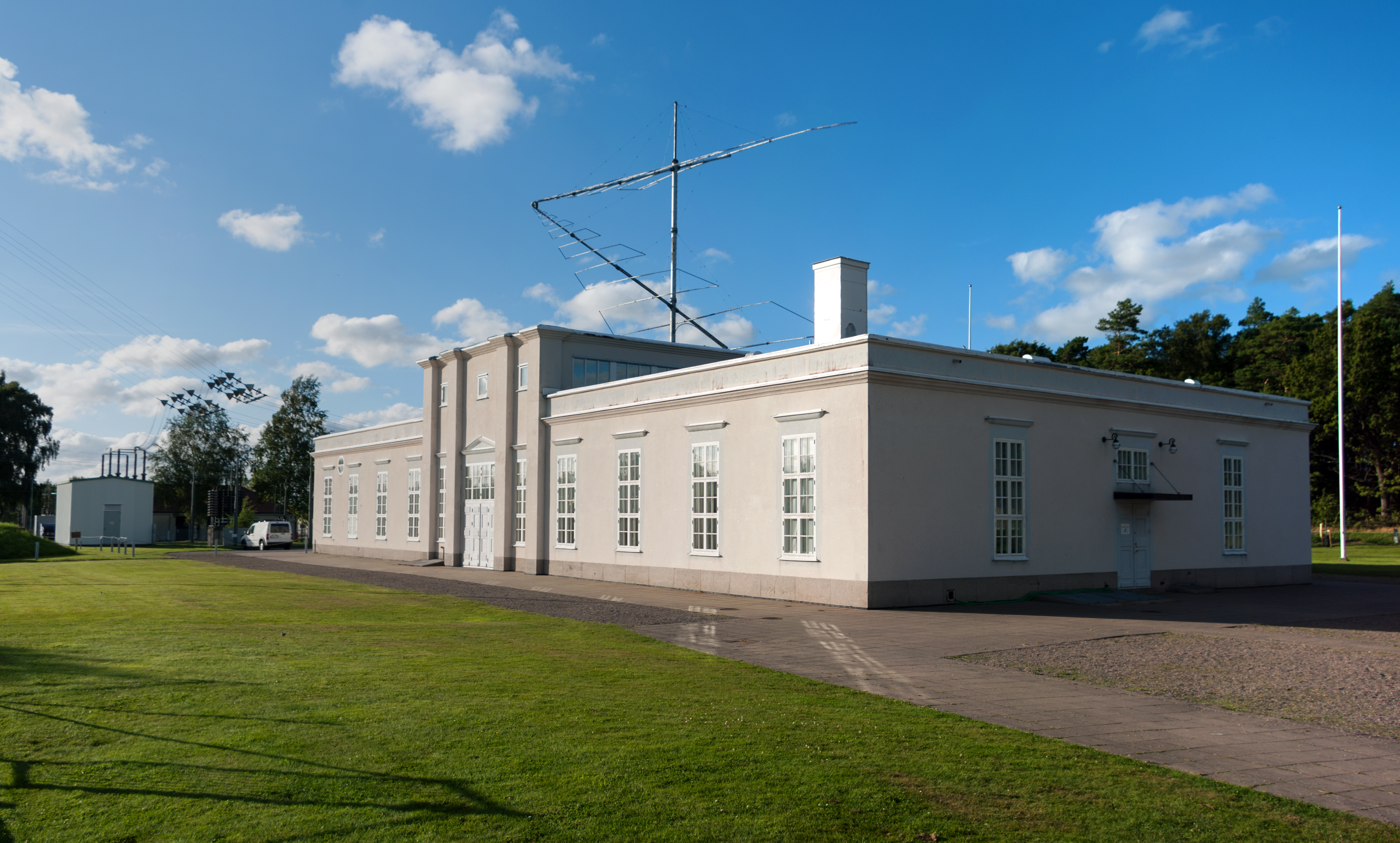
The VLF transmitter at Grimeton station.

Alexanderson Day is the day of the open house at the Swedish government's VLF transmitter Grimeton, call sign SAQ, located near Varberg. Named after the Swedish radio engineer Ernst Fredrik Werner Alexanderson, it is held on the Sunday closest to 2 July. On Alexanderson Day, Christmas Eve, and at other times during the year, the only workable Alexanderson alternator transmitter in the world is used to transmit short Morse messages on 17.2 kHz, which should be easily receivable in all of Europe. The transmitter is preserved as a historical remnant of early radio technology and as an example of VLF (Very Low Frequency) equipment.

These transmissions cannot be received by ordinary radios because of their low frequency. Modern enthusiasts often monitor the transmissions using a PC with a coil connected to the soundcard input and FFT analysis software, or a short-wave receiver with an upconverter, or any of several receivers designed to receive VLF transmissions directly. In recent years, Software-defined radio receivers have proven to be very useful and effective in receiving transmissions from SAQ around the world.
