= OLB5 =

Time signal radio station in Czech Republic

OLB5 was the callsign of a Czech time signal radio station. The station was located at Poděbrady and transmitted time signals which originated from the OMA (time signal) clock at Liblice.

The station transmitted in the HF band, on 3.17 MHz with 1 kW.
