= Goliath transmitter =

WW2 German VLF transmitter for U-Boat communications

Goliath transmitter was a very low frequency (VLF) transmitter for communicating with submarines, built by Nazi Germany's Kriegsmarine navy near Kalbe an der Milde in Saxony-Anhalt, Germany, which was in service from 1943 to 1945. It was capable of transmission power of between 100 and 1000 kW and was the most powerful transmitter of its time.

== History ==
Submarines are shielded by conducting seawater from ordinary radio communication frequencies, but radio waves in the very low frequency (VLF) band from 3 to 30 kHz can penetrate seawater to depths of about 50 ft (15 m), allowing submarines to receive communications without surfacing and becoming vulnerable to detection. From 1943 to the end of World War II, Goliath was the main radio transmitter for German submarine radio communications, operating on frequencies between 15 and 25 kHz with a main working frequency of 16.55 kHz (a wavelength of 18,114 metres). Transmitting up to 1 megawatt of power, Goliath's transmissions could be received worldwide including submerged submarines in the Caribbean, but had difficulty penetrating Norwegian fjords.

== Technical characteristics ==
Plan of Goliath

Goliath used three umbrella antennas, which were arranged radially around three 210 m (690 ft) tall guyed steel tube masts and were insulated against the ground. At their edges, these antennas were mounted on grounded 170 m (560 ft) tall guyed lattice steel masts. Three of these masts carried two umbrella antennas to comprise 15 lattice steel masts.

== Legacy of Goliath after 1945 ==
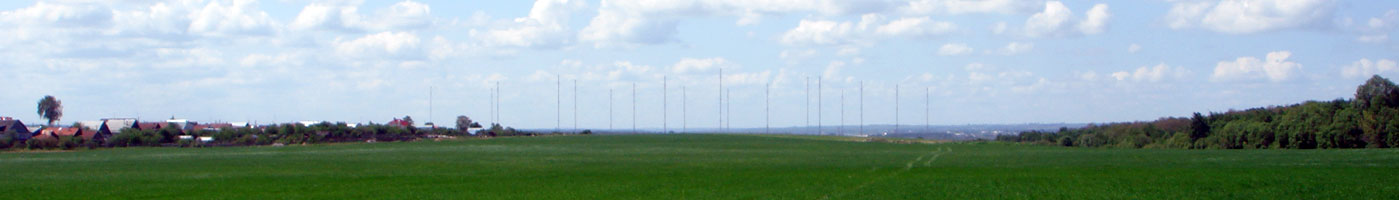
A panorama of Goliath transmitter towers in Nizhny Novgorod's suburban Kstovsky District

Shortly after World War II, the Goliath transmitter buildings and antennas were reportedly dismantled by the Soviet Union. Today only a large mast base remains of the original installation.

According to the interview given in 2007 by the commander of the present-day Goliath facility in Russia, Captain 1st Rank Yuri Gorev, to the Nizhny Novgorod edition of Argumenty i Fakty, Goliath was rebuilt between 1949 and 1952 in the Kudma River valley, in the southern suburbs of Nizhny Novgorod (Kstovsky District; 56°10′19″N 43°55′54″E). Since then, the station has been transmitting commands and time signals RJH90 for the Russian Navy. Since the 1960s, it has also participated in tracking spacecraft. The nearby settlement for the staff of the facility is known under the name Druzhniy.

The antenna system of Vileyka VLF transmitter greatly resembles that of Goliath, but all its masts are about 100 metres (300 feet) taller.
