= Herzogstand Radio Station =

Coordinates: 47°37′44″N 11°19′20″E

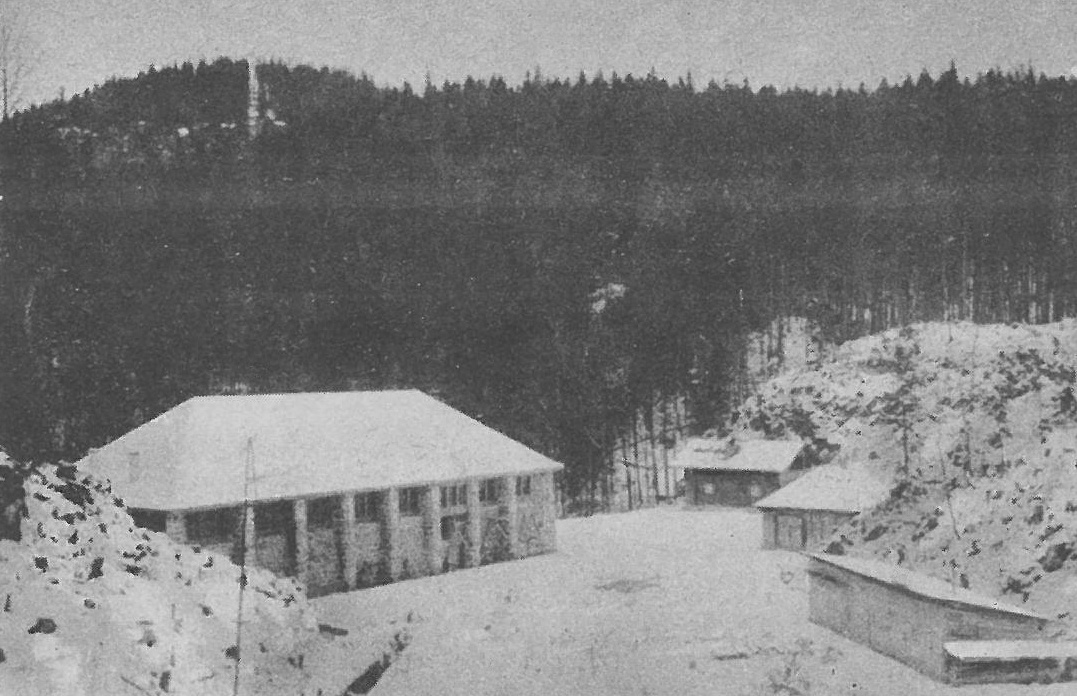
Radio Station Herzogstand 1925

Herzogstand Radio Station was a radio communication station built and operated from 1920 to 1946 on the Herzogstand mountain near the Kochelsee in Bavaria, Germany. The plant was conceived by C Lorenz AG to transmit long-wave radio traffic between Germany and the Far East, since the existing large radio stations mainly provided traffic to the west. From 1930 the apparatus was used by the Technical University of Munich for ionosphere research.

== Construction of antenna ==
As the costs of erecting a sufficiently high mast were exorbitant, a suspended antenna system in the mountains was conceived. The 1,735 metres (5,692 ft) Herzogstand mountain between the Kochelsee and Walchensee in the Bavarian Alps seemed particularly suitable for several reasons: the summit is accessible all year round, sufficient water for drinking and cooling was available, and the Lake Walchen Power Plant, conveniently situated nearby, promised a safe, economical power supply. The design of the antenna was unprecedented. A free span over a distance of more than 2,5 km resulted, together with a difference in altitude of 800 m. To achieve a sufficient height of the antenna above ground, the cable needed to run horizontally at the lower point of suspension, which required an enormous tension of the cable. Due to additional loads by wind, snow, and ice being expected, only steel wire of the highest tensile strength was found suitable. A first thin steel cable was strung in summer 1920. Measurements of the radiation at wavelengths of 12,6 km and 9.7 km resulted in signals stronger by factors 1.3 and 1.6, respectively, compared to the Eilvese transmitter serving overseas traffic and the high-powered Nauen Transmitter Station. Until early summer 1925, three antennas were strung in the shape of a fan towards the crest of the Herzogstand summit. In order to improve conductivity, the steel cable was coated with aluminum. The cable was manufactured in a purpose-built ropery plant near the summit. Near the summit the antennas were fixed to concreted steel anchors. At the lower tie points a mobile suspension system was used, in order to account for the yielding of the cables when loaded with snow and ice.

== Building of transmitter building ==
The station building for the transmitting plants and a house were erected in 1927 in the long valley above the Kochelsee on behalf of the Oberpostdirektion Munich according to plans of Robert Vorhoelzer and Walther Schmidt, and extensive grounding systems were also installed. After completion, further development and operation of the station became uneconomic, since advances in short-wave radio communications allowed the use of substantially smaller antennas.

== Ionospheric research ==
The station was finally used for research purposes by the Physical Institute of the Technical University of Munich, where the first German ionosphere research station developed under the direction of Professor Jonathan Zenneck. Using high-performance emitters at various frequencies, scientists investigated the propagation of radio waves and their reflections on the layers of the ionosphere. After purpose-built antennas for pulse transmissions were installed, the long wave antenna was dismantled in 1934. A receiving station was installed in Kochel, a few kilometres away. Occasionally additional transmitting stations in Berlin-Adlershof, Amberg and Schwandorf were used.

== End of facility ==
After the end of the Second World War the ionosphere research continued until 1946 under supervision by US personnel. Subsequently, the station and its buildings were dismantled. A memorial stone near Walchensee power station commemorates the ionospheric research station of which only remains of the anchorage points for the antenna cables as well as some foundations of the station buildings in the forest remain.
