= Vileyka VLF transmitter =

Russian radio transmitter in Belarus

- 43-й узел связи ВМФ России
- Part of Russian Navy
- Belarus

Site information
- Type: Transmitter

Location
- Vileyka in Belarus
- Location within Belarus
- Coordinates: 54.463611°N 26.778889°E
- Height: 3×330 metres (1,080 ft); 15×270 metres (890 ft)

Site history
- Built: 1964
- Built by: Soviet Union

Garrison information
- Garrison: Belarus, Minsk Oblast, Vileyka
- Occupants: Russian Navy

The "Vileyka" VLF transmitter is the site of the 43rd Communications Center of the Russian Navy (Russian: 43-й узел связи ВМФ России), located west of the town of Vileyka in Belarus (54°27′49″N 26°46′44″E). The "Vileyka" VLF transmitter is an important facility for transmitting orders to submarines in the very low frequency range. Beside this, it is used for transmitting the time signal RJH69 at certain times.

In common with the former Goliath transmitter of the Kriegsmarine in World War II, the antenna system of the "Vileyka" VLF transmitter consists of three antenna systems with a central mast insulated against ground from which antenna wires run to six grounded ring masts, where they are fixed by insulators. As at former Goliath transmitter, three ring masts carry two antenna systems, so there are only 15 ring masts on the site. A further common ground to former Goliath transmitter is, that the ring masts of the Goliath transmitter are masts of lattice steel with triangular cross section, while the central masts are steel tube masts.

The 15 ring masts of the "Vileyka" VLF transmitter are 270 metres (890 ft), and the three central masts of VLF transmitter are 330 metres (1,080 ft) tall. Their height surpasses therefore the height of the masts of former Goliath transmitter nearly exactly of 135 metres (443 ft).

== See also ==
- Russian military presence in Belarus
- Baranavichy Radar Station
