= Walchensee (hamlet) =

Human settlement in Germany

Coordinates: 47°35′29″N 11°18′39″E

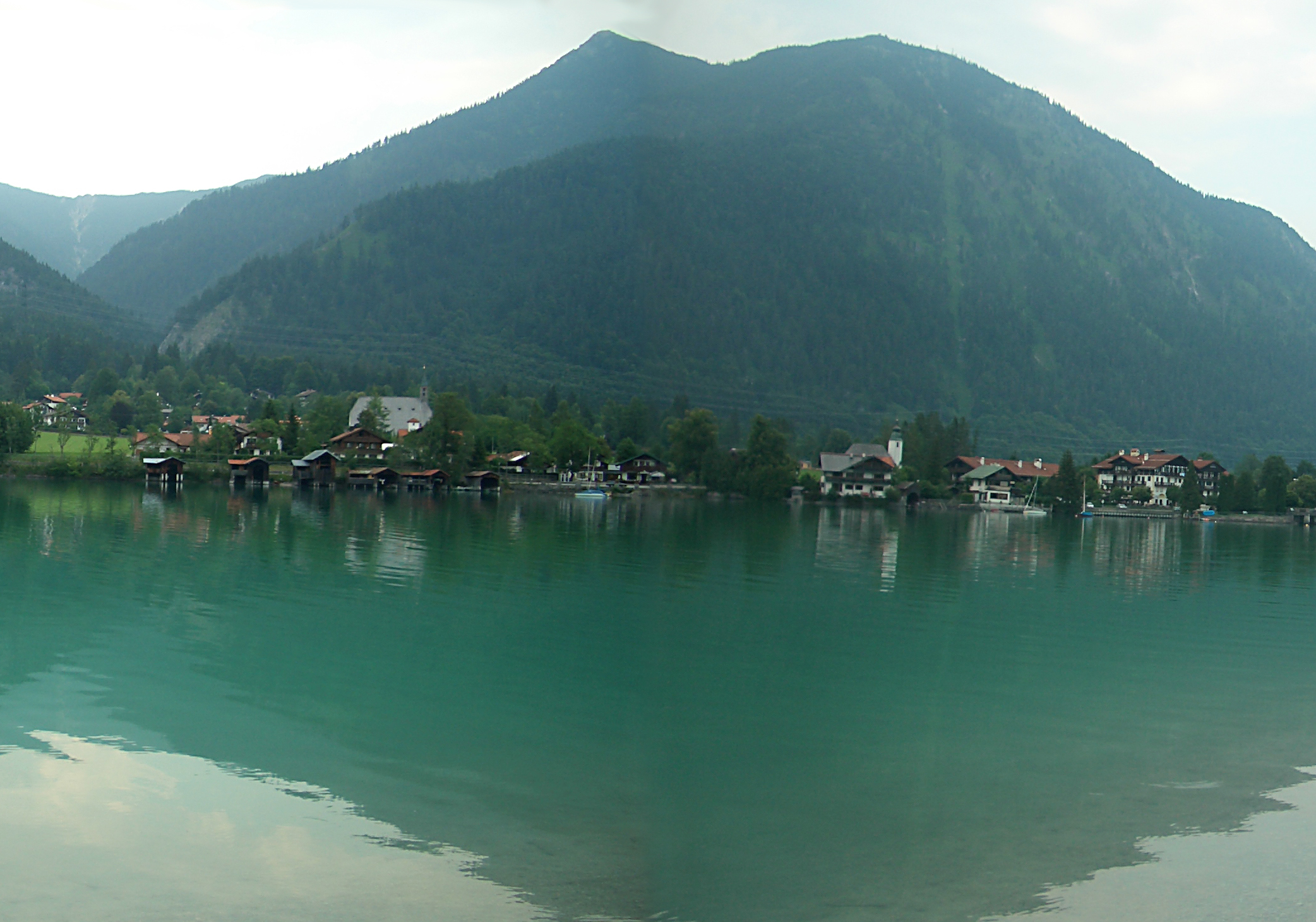
Walchensee (town)

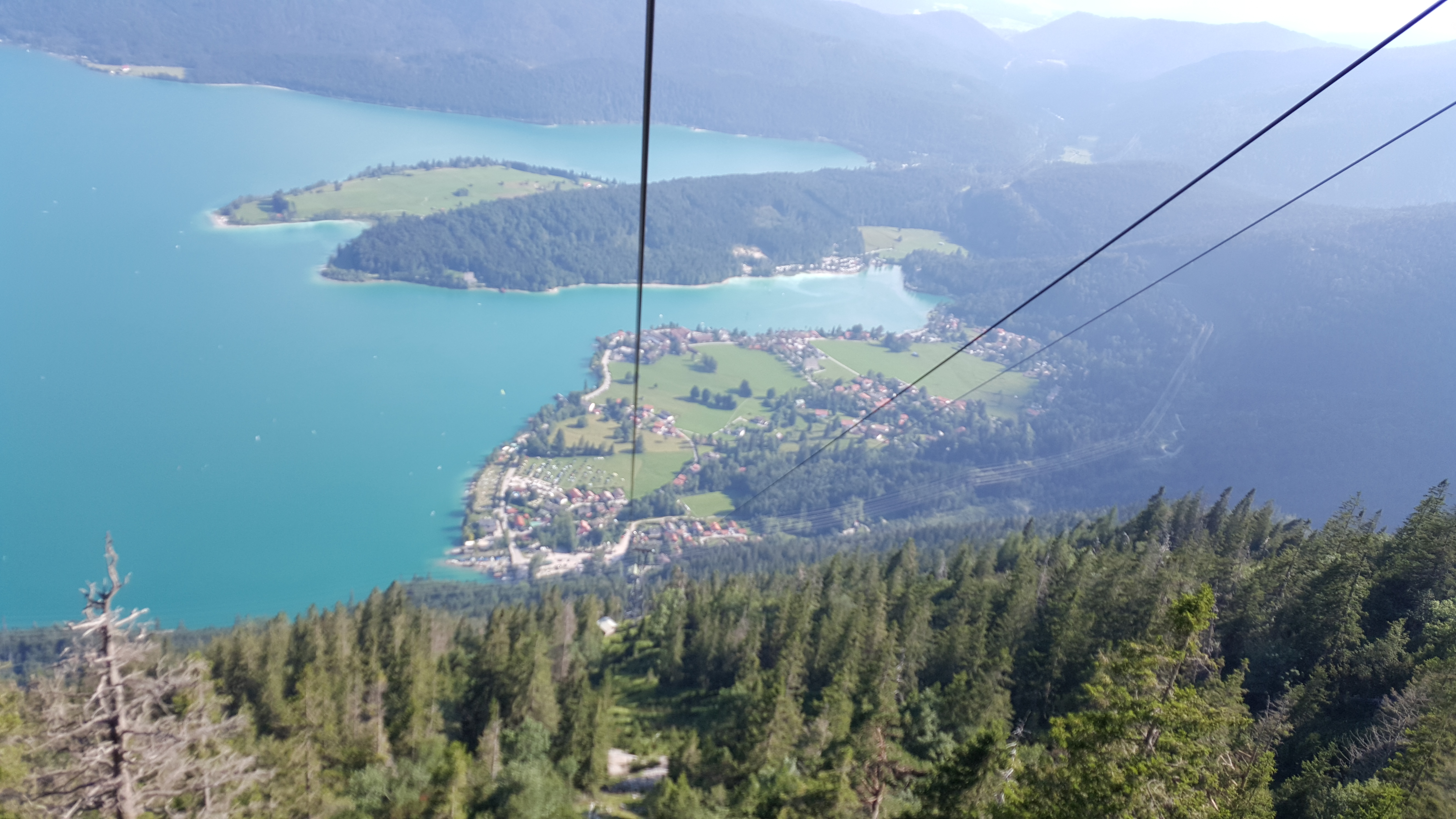
View of the town from Mt. Herzogstand

Walchensee is a small fishing village in the Kochel municipality (Landkreis Bad Tölz-Wolfratshausen, Upper Bavaria) at a height of 803 metres and a population of 250 plus tourists. It is located directly on the western banks of the Lake of the same name.

Human settlement begun around 1130 by erection of a house for fishermen.

The federal highway Bundesstraße 11 runs through the town which is heavily visited by tourists (outdoor recreation). The nearest train station is Kochel a. See (11.2 km) which is connected by bus (line # 9608 by Regionalverkehr Oberbayern / DB Oberbayernbus). The aerial tramway Herzogstand Cable Car starts here.
