= Noviken VLF Transmitter =

NATO facility in Nordland county, Norway

Noviken VLF Transmitter is a facility used by NATO for transmitting messages to submerged submarines on 16.4 kHz under the callsign JXN. It is situated in Gildeskål Municipality, Norway and uses as antenna four wires spun between two mountains. The longest of these spans is 2,375 metres (7,792 ft) long.

The transmitter building is situated at 66° 58′ 58″ N, 13° 52′ 23″ E.
