= Kahuku Marconi Station =

Historic structure on Oʻahu's North Shore

- Marconi Wireless Telegraphy Station
- U.S. National Register of Historic Places
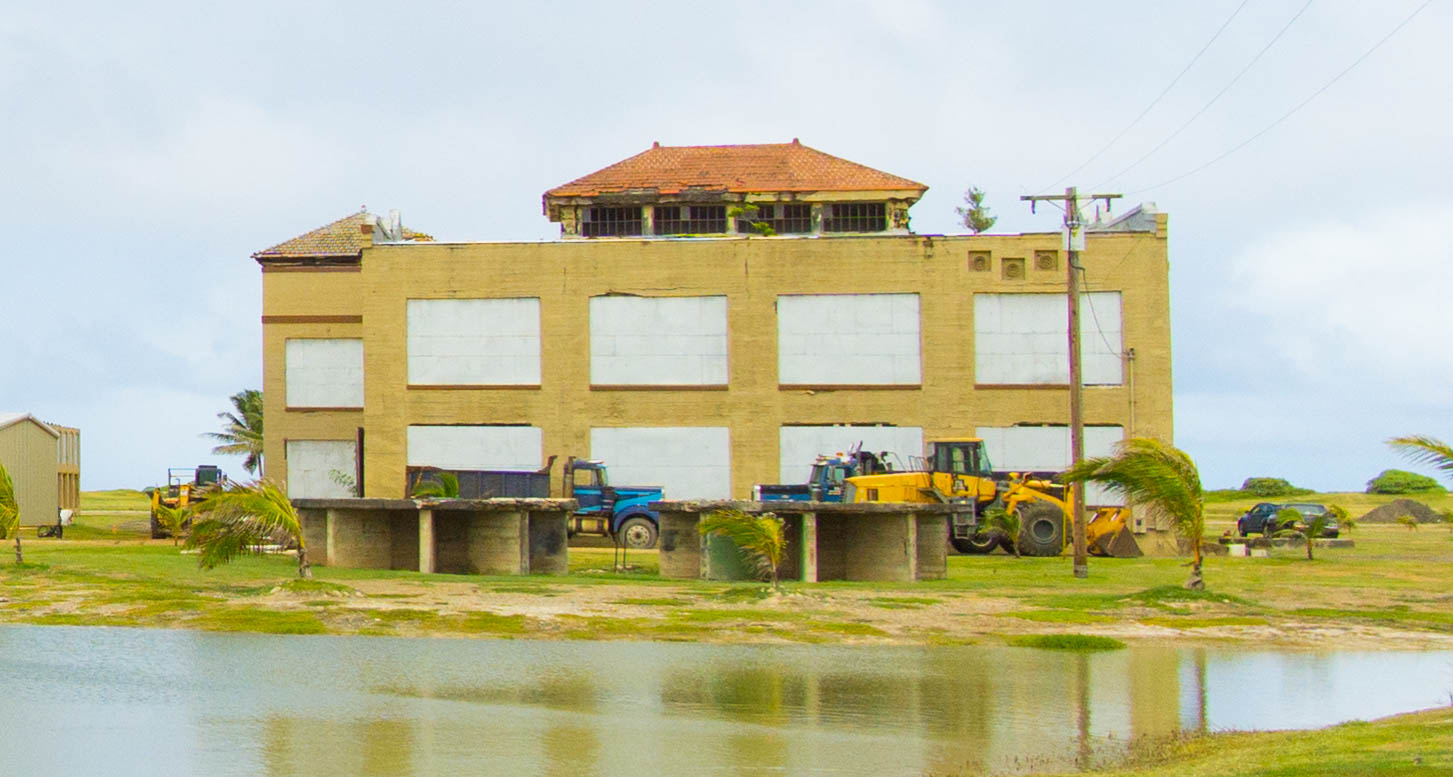
- The station in 2017

- Location within Hawaii
- Location: 58-1095 Kamehameha Hwy., Kahuku
- Coordinates: 21°42′22.7″N 157°58′23.1″W
- Area: 89 acres (36 ha)
- Built: 1914
- Architect: J. G. White
- Architectural style: Hawaiian architecture
- NRHP reference No.: 13000352
- Added to NRHP: June 4, 2013

The Kahuku Marconi wireless station is a historic structure on Oʻahu's North Shore between the towns of Kawela Bay and Kahuku. It was briefly the world's most powerful telegraph station. It is listed on the National Register of Historic Places as the Marconi Wireless Telegraphy Station.

== History ==
Opened in 1914, at a cost of more than one million dollars, the first message was sent from Iolani Palace to Kaimuki. By 1916 messages were being sent to Japan, at a distance of 4,200 miles. A hotel was built to accommodate employees, along with a station master's building and an additional administration building. A library was provided for staff, and the hotel had a full-time Chinese cook. In 1917, the United States took over control of all wireless stations. Following the war's conclusion, RCA ended up with ownership of the Kahuku station. The rapid acceleration of radio technology development meant that the station became obsolete much sooner than anticipated. By 1919 the station was already being described as "junk". In 1924 its chimney was removed, as steam was no longer being used to power the station. RCA installed new Alexanderson alternators were installed in 1921, with an output of two hundred kilowatts. In 1931, the original 470 foot tall masts were replaced by 100 foot wooden masts, thanks to advances in short wave technology. During World War Two the site hosted an airfield, but a tsunami destroyed much of the base. Later on, the Turtle Bay Golf Course built over much of one of the runways, and no military structures remain. During the early 2000s, the site was used for aquaculture and the telegraph station was beginning to deteriorate. In 2005 the station and surrounds were purchased by a businessman, and are currently being redeveloped for tourism. In 2024 the current owners and developers demolished the roof and interior of one the remaining structures without a permit.
