= Ukiah =

Ukiah may refer to:

== Places ==
- Ukiah, California, a city in the U.S. state of California
  - Ukiah Valley, a valley in Mendocino County, California, which contains the city
- Ukiah, Oregon, a city in the U.S. state of Oregon

== Other uses ==
- "Ukiah", a song by the Doobie Brothers, from the album The Captain and Me
- Ukiah Oregon, a fictional character in a series of science fiction books by Wen Spencer
- Yuki language, a language spoken by the Yuki Indians of California, also known as the Ukiah language
  - Yuki people, an indigenous people of California

== See also ==
- Yuki (disambiguation)
- Haiku (disambiguation), since "Haiku" is "Ukiah" spelled backwards
