= Haikou (disambiguation) =

Haikou is the capital of Hainan Province, China.

Haikou may also refer to:

- Haikou, Fuqing, town in Fuqing County, Fuzhou City, Fujian, China
- Haikou Subdistrict (formerly, Haikou Town), in Xishan District, Kunming, Yunnan, China
- Several other towns named Haikou; see zh:海口镇

== Various objects near Haikou, Hainan ==
- Haikou Bay
- Haikou Meilan International Airport
- Haikou Xiuying Port
- Haikou New Port

== Ships ==
- Chinese destroyer Haikou (171)

== See also ==
- Haiku (disambiguation)
