= Datatrak =

Datatrak was a hyperbolic radio navigation system similar to Decca, which operated on frequencies between 130 kHz and 150 kHz in the LF-range.

Datatrak was operated in the UK by Securicor Information Systems and by Siemens-Datatrak on continental Europe and was originally used for the surveillance of vehicles of Securicor, but later also allowed for the use of other customers.

The Datatrak receiver determines its exact position from the LF signals and transmits its position back to the central in Swindon, UK by UHF radio links, whereby also the transmission of telemetry data was possible. Datatrak was in use from the 1980s until the first half of the first decade in the 21st century in use in Germany, UK, Austria, Belgium, Luxembourg, Malta and the Netherlands. While the original UK network was shut down at midnight on October 31, 2011, it was also in use in some countries outside Europe and was for example in use in Argentina until 2014.
