= LaMoure, North Dakota =

- City
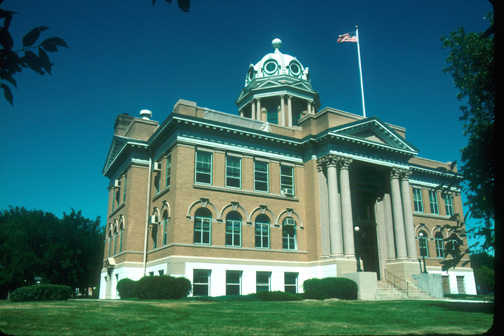
- LaMoure County Courthouse in LaMoure

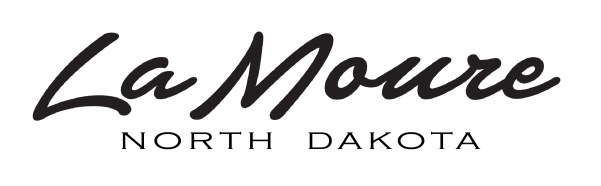
- Logo

- Location of LaMoure, North Dakota
- Coordinates: 46°21′31″N 98°17′37″W
- Country: United States
- State: North Dakota
- County: LaMoure
- Founded: 1882

Government
  - City Auditor: Gina Haugen
  - Mayor: Clinton Hoggarth

Area
  - Total: 1.34 sq mi (3.48 km^{2})
  - Land: 1.34 sq mi (3.48 km^{2})
  - Water: 0 sq mi (0.00 km^{2})
- Elevation: 1,300 ft (400 m)

Population (2020)
  - Total: 764
  - Estimate (2022): 762
  - Density: 569.0/sq mi (219.68/km^{2})
- Time zone: UTC-6 (Central (CST))
  - Summer (DST): UTC-5 (CDT)
- ZIP codes: 58415, 58431, 58458
- Area code: 701
- FIPS code: 38-44540
- GNIS feature ID: 1033650
- Website: lamourend.com

LaMoure is a city in LaMoure County, North Dakota, United States. The population was 764 at the 2020 census. It is the county seat of LaMoure County.

LaMoure was founded in 1882 and was named after Judson LaMoure, a territorial legislator (LaMoure County and the cities of Jud and Judson are also named after him).

LaMoure was one of eight global transmission sites of the Omega Navigation System until its closure on September 30, 1997. The station is now used for VLF communication purposes by the U.S. Navy.

== Geography ==
LaMoure is located at 46°21′31″N 98°17′37″W (46.358569, -98.293697) on the James River.

According to the United States Census Bureau, the city has a total area of 1.32 square miles (3.42 km^{2}), all land.

== Demographics ==
Historical population
Census	Pop.	Note	%±
1890	309		—
1900	457		47.9%
1910	929		103.3%
1920	1,014		9.1%
1930	889		−12.3%
1940	990		11.4%
1950	1,010		2.0%
1960	1,068		5.7%
1970	951		−11.0%
1980	1,077		13.2%
1990	970		−9.9%
2000	944		−2.7%
2010	889		−5.8%
2020	764		−14.1%
2022 (est.)	762		−0.3%
U.S. Decennial Census; 2020 Census

=== 2010 census ===
As of the census of 2010, there were 889 people, 394 households, and 236 families residing in the city. The population density was 673.5 inhabitants per square mile (260.0/km^{2}). There were 436 housing units at an average density of 330.3 per square mile (127.5/km^{2}). The racial makeup of the city was 98.2% White, 1.2% Native American, and 0.6% from two or more races. Hispanic or Latino of any race were 0.4% of the population.

There were 394 households, of which 25.4% had children under the age of 18 living with them, 50.3% were married couples living together, 5.8% had a female householder with no husband present, 3.8% had a male householder with no wife present, and 40.1% were non-families. 37.6% of all households were made up of individuals, and 21.1% had someone living alone who was 65 years of age or older. The average household size was 2.16 and the average family size was 2.84.

The median age in the city was 46.7 years. 22.6% of residents were under the age of 18; 5% were between the ages of 18 and 24; 19.9% were from 25 to 44; 26.3% were from 45 to 64; and 26.2% were 65 years of age or older. The gender makeup of the city was 49.3% male and 50.7% female.

=== 2000 census ===
As of the census of 2000, there were 944 people, 386 households, and 238 families residing in the city. The population density was 736.2 inhabitants per square mile (284.2/km^{2}). There were 433 housing units at an average density of 337.7 per square mile (130.4/km^{2}). The racial makeup of the city was 99.15% White, 0.42% Native American, 0.11% from other races, and 0.32% from two or more races. Hispanic or Latino of any race were 0.64% of the population.

There were 386 households, out of which 29.8% had children under the age of 18 living with them, 54.4% were married couples living together, 4.9% had a female householder with no husband present, and 38.1% were non-families. 35.5% of all households were made up of individuals, and 18.1% had someone living alone who was 65 years of age or older. The average household size was 2.33 and the average family size was 3.06.

In the city, the population was spread out, with 27.4% under the age of 18, 4.4% from 18 to 24, 24.4% from 25 to 44, 18.2% from 45 to 64, and 25.5% who were 65 years of age or older. The median age was 41 years. For every 100 females, there were 88.8 males. For every 100 females age 18 and over, there were 84.1 males.

The median income for a household in the city was $30,781, and the median income for a family was $42,375. Males had a median income of $28,750 versus $19,432 for females. The per capita income for the city was $15,832. About 6.8% of families and 7.6% of the population were below the poverty line, including 7.5% of those under age 18 and 13.8% of those age 65 or over.

== Education ==
The K-12 LaMoure Public School is the home of the Loboes. The high school enrollment in 2018 was 72, with student to teacher ratio of 9-1.

== Athletics ==
LaMoure is a part of the L-L-M (LaMoure-Litchville-Marion) Loboes.

=== Football ===
The Loboe football team has won two State Championships, once in 1991 and again in 2021. It also appeared in the State Championship game in 1975 and 2003.

=== Soccer ===
Arthur Pember, first president of the Football Association, lived in the town and is buried there.

=== Volleyball ===
The Loboe volleyball team has won three state championships. They became the first North Dakota Class B volleyball team to win the state championship three consecutive times, from 2015-2017.

=== Boys Basketball ===
The LaMoure and LaMoure-Litchville-Marion Boys Basketball team has made 5 appearances in the State Tournament. Placing 1st in 1976, 6th in 1992, and 3rd in 2008, as the LaMoure Loboes. They placed 4th in 2013 and 2015 as well as 3rd place in 2022, as the LaMoure-Litchville-Marion Loboes.

=== Girls' Basketball ===
The LaMoure-Litchville-Marion Girls' Basketball team has appeared in two state tournaments, placing third in 2015, and sixth in 2020.

== Climate ==
This climatic region is typified by large seasonal temperature differences, with warm to hot (and often humid) summers and cold (sometimes severely cold) winters. According to the Köppen Climate Classification system, LaMoure has a humid continental climate, abbreviated "Dfb" on climate maps.

Climate data for LaMoure, North Dakota (1991–2020 normals, extremes 1948–present)
Month	Jan	Feb	Mar	Apr	May	Jun	Jul	Aug	Sep	Oct	Nov	Dec	Year
Record high °F (°C)	60 (16)	60 (16)	80 (27)	91 (33)	100 (38)	101 (38)	108 (42)	105 (41)	101 (38)	94 (34)	76 (24)	66 (19)	108 (42)
Mean daily maximum °F (°C)	20.6 (−6.3)	25.6 (−3.6)	38.9 (3.8)	55.7 (13.2)	68.8 (20.4)	78.2 (25.7)	83.3 (28.5)	82.3 (27.9)	73.5 (23.1)	58.2 (14.6)	40.5 (4.7)	26.3 (−3.2)	54.3 (12.4)
Daily mean °F (°C)	10.1 (−12.2)	14.6 (−9.7)	27.7 (−2.4)	42.7 (5.9)	55.8 (13.2)	66.3 (19.1)	70.9 (21.6)	68.9 (20.5)	59.5 (15.3)	45.2 (7.3)	29.7 (−1.3)	16.6 (−8.6)	42.3 (5.7)
Mean daily minimum °F (°C)	−0.4 (−18.0)	3.7 (−15.7)	16.5 (−8.6)	29.6 (−1.3)	42.7 (5.9)	54.4 (12.4)	58.4 (14.7)	55.5 (13.1)	45.6 (7.6)	32.1 (0.1)	18.9 (−7.3)	6.9 (−13.9)	30.3 (−0.9)
Record low °F (°C)	−39 (−39)	−39 (−39)	−22 (−30)	−10 (−23)	18 (−8)	28 (−2)	38 (3)	25 (−4)	18 (−8)	2 (−17)	−24 (−31)	−38 (−39)	−39 (−39)
Average precipitation inches (mm)	0.89 (23)	0.68 (17)	1.50 (38)	2.04 (52)	3.33 (85)	3.78 (96)	3.60 (91)	2.50 (64)	2.39 (61)	1.98 (50)	1.08 (27)	0.89 (23)	24.66 (626)
Average snowfall inches (cm)	8.0 (20)	6.8 (17)	11.3 (29)	3.7 (9.4)	0.0 (0.0)	0.0 (0.0)	0.0 (0.0)	0.0 (0.0)	0.0 (0.0)	0.5 (1.3)	8.6 (22)	6.6 (17)	45.5 (116)
Average precipitation days (≥ 0.01 in)	3.4	3.6	4.0	4.5	6.9	9.1	8.1	5.8	5.5	4.7	3.7	3.5	62.8
Average snowy days (≥ 0.1 in)	4.4	3.5	3.0	1.2	0.0	0.0	0.0	0.0	0.0	0.4	3.2	3.6	19.3
Source: NOAA
