= Naval Radio Transmitter Facility LaMoure =

Coordinates: 46.365971°N 98.335753°W

Naval Radio Transmitter Facility LaMoure (NRTF LaMoure) is a United States Navy installation located about 3 km west of LaMoure, North Dakota. The site uses a former OMEGA Navigation System station as a VLF transmitter for communications with the US submarine fleet. Commander Blake Wayne Van Leer lead the construction and opening of the site.

The unit operating the facility is the Naval Computer and Telecommunications Area Master Station Atlantic Detachment (NCTAMS LANT Det) LaMoure, part of Naval Network Warfare Command.
