= Low frequency =

30–300 kHz range of the electromagnetic spectrum

- Frequency range: 30–300 kHz
- Wavelength range: 10–1 km

Low frequency (LF) is the ITU designation for radio frequencies (RF) in the range of 30–300 kHz. Since its wavelengths range from 10–1 km, respectively, it is also known as the kilometre band or kilometre waves. Frequencies immediately below LF are denoted very low frequency (VLF), while the next band of higher frequencies is known as the medium frequency (MF) band.

LF radio waves exhibit low signal attenuation, making them suitable for long-distance communications. In Europe and areas of Northern Africa and Asia, part of the LF spectrum is used for AM broadcasting as the "longwave" band. In the western hemisphere, its main use is for aircraft beacons, navigation (LORAN, mostly defunct), information, and weather systems. A number of time signal broadcasts also use this band. The main mode of transmission used in this band is ground waves, in which LF radio waves travel just above the Earth's surface, following the terrain. LF ground waves can travel over hills, and can travel far beyond the horizon, up to several hundred kilometers from the transmitter.

== Propagation ==
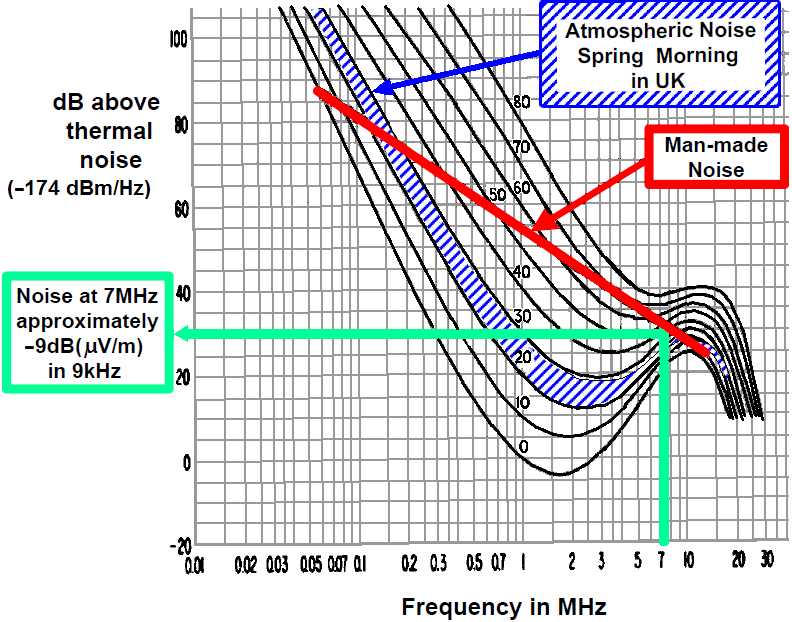
Atmospheric radio noise increases with decreasing frequency. At the LF band and below, it is far above the thermal noise floor injected by amplifier circuits in the receiver, so weak signals can be amplified in the receiver to compensate with no perceivable increase in the noise (see SNR). Consequently, for reception, even inefficient antennas much smaller than the wavelength are adequate.

Because of their long wavelength, low frequency radio waves can diffract over obstacles like mountain ranges and travel beyond the horizon, following the contour of the Earth. This mode of propagation, called ground wave, with the radio waves traveling horizontally through the atmosphere just above the surface of the Earth, is the main mode in the LF band. Ground waves are absorbed by the Earth as they travel, so the signal strength (power density) decreases exponentially with distance from the transmitting antenna, limiting transmission distance. The attenuation of signal strength with distance is lower than at higher frequencies. Low frequency ground waves can be received up to 2,000 kilometres (1,200 mi) from the transmitting antenna. Ground waves must be vertically polarized (the electric field is vertical while the magnetic field is horizontal), so vertical monopole antennas are used for transmitting.

Low frequency waves can also occasionally travel long distances by reflecting from the ionosphere (the actual mechanism is one of refraction), although this method, called skywave or "skip" propagation, is not as common as at higher frequencies. Reflection occurs at the ionospheric E layer or F layers. Skywave signals can be detected at distances exceeding 3,000 kilometres (1,900 mi) from the transmitting antenna.

== Uses ==
=== Radio broadcasting ===
AM broadcasting is authorized in the longwave band on frequencies between 148.5 and 283.5 kHz in Europe and parts of Asia.

=== Standard time signals ===
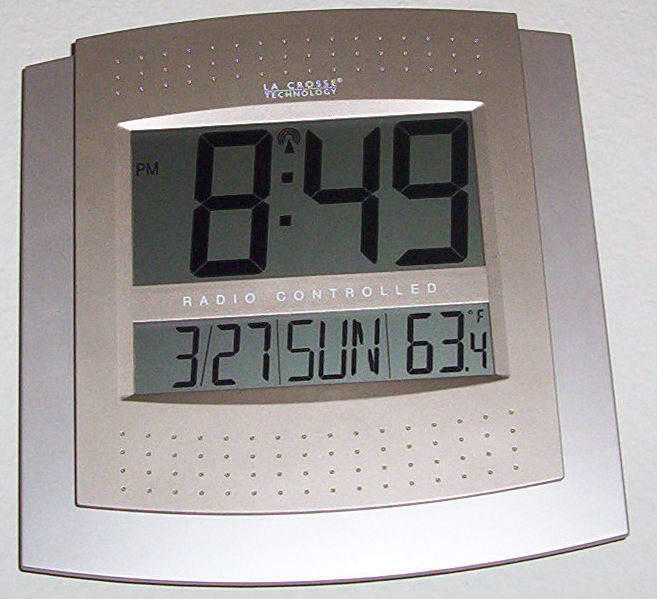
An LF radio clock

In Europe and Japan, many low-cost consumer devices since the late 1980s have contained radio clocks with an LF receiver for these signals. Since these frequencies propagate by ground wave only, the precision of time signals is not affected by varying propagation paths between the transmitter, the ionosphere, and the receiver. In the United States, such devices became feasible for the mass market only after the output power of the WWVB time signal radio station was increased in 1997 and 1999.

JJY time signal radio station broadcasts on the exact same frequency, and has a similar timecode.

=== Military ===
Radio signals below 50 kHz are capable of penetrating the ocean to depths of approximately 200 metres (660 ft); the longer the wavelength, the deeper the radio waves can go. The British, German, Indian, Russian, Swedish, United States, and possibly other navies communicate with submarines on these frequencies.

In addition, Royal Navy nuclear submarines carrying ballistic missiles are allegedly under standing orders to monitor the BBC Radio 4 transmission on 198 kHz in waters near the UK. It is rumoured that they are to construe a sudden halt in transmission, particularly of the morning news programme Today, as an indicator that the UK is under attack, whereafter their sealed orders take effect.

The United States has four LF stations maintaining contact with its submarine force: Aguada, Puerto Rico, Keflavik, Iceland, Awase, Okinawa, and Sigonella, Italy, using AN/FRT-95 solid state transmitters.

In the U.S., the Ground Wave Emergency Network or GWEN operated between 150 and 175 kHz, until it was replaced by satellite communications systems in 1999. GWEN was a land-based military radio communications system which could survive and continue to operate even in the case of a nuclear attack.

=== Experimental and amateur ===
The 2007 World Radiocommunication Conference (WRC-07) made a worldwide amateur radio allocation in this band. An international 2.1 kHz allocation, the 2200 meter band (135.7–137.9 kHz) is available to amateur radio operators in several countries in Europe, New Zealand, Canada, US, and French overseas dependencies.

The world record distance for a two-way contact is over 10,000 km from near Vladivostok to New Zealand. As well as conventional Morse code, many operators use very slow computer-controlled Morse code (so-called "QRSS") or specialized digital communication modes.

The UK allocated a 2.8 kHz sliver of spectrum from 71.6 kHz to 74.4 kHz beginning in April 1996 to UK amateurs who applied for a Notice of Variation to use the band on a noninterference basis with a maximum output power of 1 Watt ERP. This was withdrawn on 30 June 2003 after a number of extensions in favor of the cross-European standard 136 kHz band. Very slow Morse Code from G3AQC in the UK was received 3,275 miles (5,271 km) away, across the Atlantic Ocean, by W1TAG in the US on 21-22 November 2001 on 72.401 kHz. (Note: Low-frequency experimenter Lawrence "Laurie" Mayhead, G3AQC, has added another LF accomplishment to his list – trans-Atlantic reception of his 73 kHz signal. [...] Mayhead reports that on the night of 21-22 November, his signal on 72.401 kHz was received in the US. "I managed to transmit a full call sign to John Andrews, W1TAG, in Holden, Massachusetts", he said. Mayhead was using dual-frequency CW – or DFCW – featuring elements that are two minutes long; Andrews detected his signal using ARGO DSP software. — ARRL Nov 2001)

In the United States, there is an exemption within Part 15 of the FCC regulations permitting unlicensed transmissions in the frequency range of 160–190 kHz. Longwave radio hobbyists refer to this as the 'LowFER' band, and experimenters, and their transmitters are called 'LowFERs'. This frequency range between 160 kHz and 190 kHz is also referred to as the 1750 meter band. Requirements include:

- The total input power to the final radio frequency stage (exclusive of filament or heater power) shall not exceed one watt.
- The total length of the transmission line, antenna, and ground lead (if used) shall not exceed 15 meters.
- All emissions below 160 kHz or above 190 kHz shall be attenuated at least 20 dB below the level of the unmodulated carrier.
- As an alternative to these requirements, a field strength of 2400/F(kHz) microvolts/meter (measured at a distance of 300 meters) may be used (as described in 47CFR15.209).
- In all cases, operation may not cause harmful interference to licensed services.

Many experimenters in this band are amateur radio operators.

=== Meteorological information broadcasts ===
A regular service transmitting RTTY marine meteorological information in SYNOP code on LF is the German Meteorological Service (Deutscher Wetterdienst or DWD). The DWD operates station DDH47 on 147.3 kHz using standard ITA-2 alphabet with a transmission speed of 50 baud and FSK modulation with 85 Hz shift.

=== Radio navigation signals ===
In parts of the world where there is no longwave broadcasting service, Non-directional beacons used for aeronavigation operate on 190–300 kHz (and beyond into the MW band). In Europe, Asia and Africa, the NDB allocation starts on 283.5 kHz.

The LORAN-C radio navigation system operated on 100 kHz.

In the past, the Decca Navigator System operated between 70 kHz and 129 kHz. The last Decca chains were closed down in 2000.

Differential GPS telemetry transmitters operate between 283.5 and 325 kHz.

The commercial "Datatrak" radio navigation system operates on a number of frequencies, varying by country, between 120–148 kHz.

=== Other applications ===
Some radio frequency identification (RFID) tags utilize LF. These tags are commonly known as LFIDs or LowFIDs (low frequency identification). The LF RFID tags are near-field devices, interacting with the inductive near field, rather than with radiated waves (radio waves) that are the only part of the electromagnetic field that persists into the far field. As such, they are technically not radio devices nor radio antennas, even though they do operate at radio frequencies, and are called "antennas" in the RFID trade, but not in radio engineering. It is more proper, and technically more informative to think of them as secondary coils of very loosely coupled transformers.

== Antennas ==
Since the ground waves used in this band require vertical polarization, vertical antennas are used for transmission. Mast radiators are most common, either insulated from the ground and fed at the bottom, or occasionally fed through guy-wires. T-antennas and inverted L-antennas are used when antenna height is an issue.

LF transmitting antennas for high power transmitters require large amounts of space, and have been the cause of controversy in Europe and the United States, due to concerns about possible health hazards associated with human exposure to radio waves.

=== Longwave receiving antennas ===
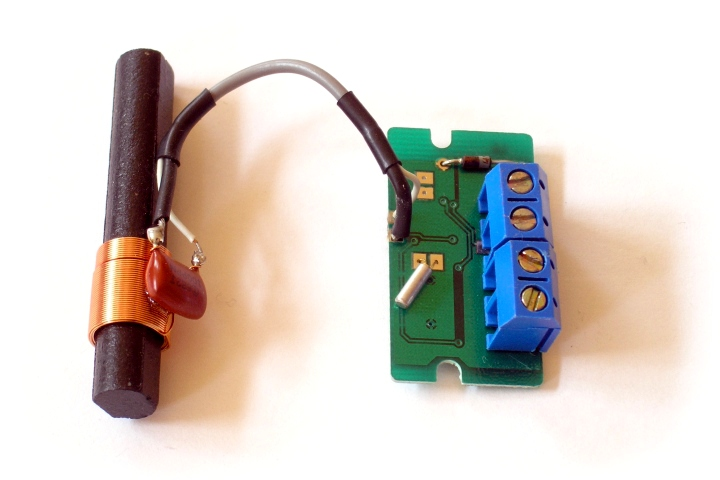
Low cost LF time signal crystal receiver using ferrite loop antenna.

Antenna requirements for LF reception are much more modest than for transmission. Although non-resonant long wire antennas are sometimes used, ferrite loop antennas are far more popular because of their small size.

Amateur radio operators have achieved good LF reception using active antennas: A short whip with a built-in pre-amplifier.

=== Antenna heights ===
Due to the long wavelengths in the band, nearly all LF antennas are electrically short, shorter than one quarter of the radiated wavelength, so their low radiation resistance makes them inefficient, requiring very low resistance grounds and conductors to avoid dissipating transmitter power. These electrically short antennas need loading coils at the base of the antenna to bring them into resonance. Many antenna types, such as the umbrella antenna and L- and T-antenna, use capacitive top-loading (a "top hat"), in the form of a network of horizontal wires attached to the top of the vertical radiator. The capacitance improves the efficiency of the antenna by increasing the current, without increasing its height.

The height of antennas differ by usage. For some non-directional beacons (NDBs) the height can be as low as 10 meters, while for more powerful navigation transmitters such as DECCA, masts with a height around 100 meters are used. T-antennas have a height between 50–200 meters, while mast aerials are usually taller than 150 meters.

The height of mast antennas for LORAN-C is around 190 meters for transmitters with radiated power below 500 kW, and around 400 meters for transmitters greater than 1000 kilowatts. The main type of LORAN-C antenna is insulated from ground.

LF (longwave) broadcasting stations use mast antennas with heights of more than 150 meters or T-aerials. The mast antennas can be ground-fed insulated masts or upper-fed grounded masts. It is also possible to use cage antennas on grounded masts.

=== Directional array antennas ===
For broadcasting stations, directional antennas are often required. They consist of multiple masts, which often have the same height. Some longwave antennas consist of multiple mast antennas arranged in a circle with or without a mast antenna in the center. Such antennas focus the transmitted power toward ground and give a large zone of fade-free reception. This type of antenna is rarely used, because they are very expensive, require plenty of space and because fading does not occur as often in the longwave range as it does in the medium wave range. One antenna of this kind was used by transmitter Orlunda in Sweden.

== See also ==
- 2200-meter band
- Ground Wave Emergency Network (GWEN)
- Longwave
- LowFER
- Passive RFID
- Time signal
- WGU-20
