= Haiku (disambiguation) =

Haiku is a type of short form poetry that originated in Japan.

Haiku may also refer to:

== Music ==
- Haiku (Don Ellis album), 1973
- Haiku (Joey Calderazzo album), 2002
- Haiku, a 1995 jazz album by Lee Konitz
- "Haiku", a song by Tally Hall from the 2005 album Marvin's Marvelous Mechanical Museum

== Places ==
- Haiku, Hawaii
- Haiku-Pauwela, Hawaii
- Haiku Valley, a valley in the Koʻolau Range in the Hawaiian Islands
- 12477 Haiku, a main-belt asteroid

== Other uses ==
- Haiku in English, the English-language derivative of the Japanese poetic form
- Haiku (operating system), an open-source re-creation of BeOS
- Pasanga 2: Haiku, a 2015 Indian Tamil-language film, sequel to the 2009 film Pasanga
- haikU, a digital poetry project
- Haiku (film), a 2026 Indian Tamil-language film

== See also ==
- Haiku d'Etat, an alternative hip hop group
- Haiku Tunnel, an office comedy about the struggle between tempness and permness
- Haiku Stairs, a hiking trail on Oahu, Hawaii
- Haikou, a city on the island of Hainan in the People's Republic of China
