= Haʻikū Stairs =

Former access to U.S. Navy radio station on Oahu, Hawaii

Coordinates: 21.3957°N 157.8241°W

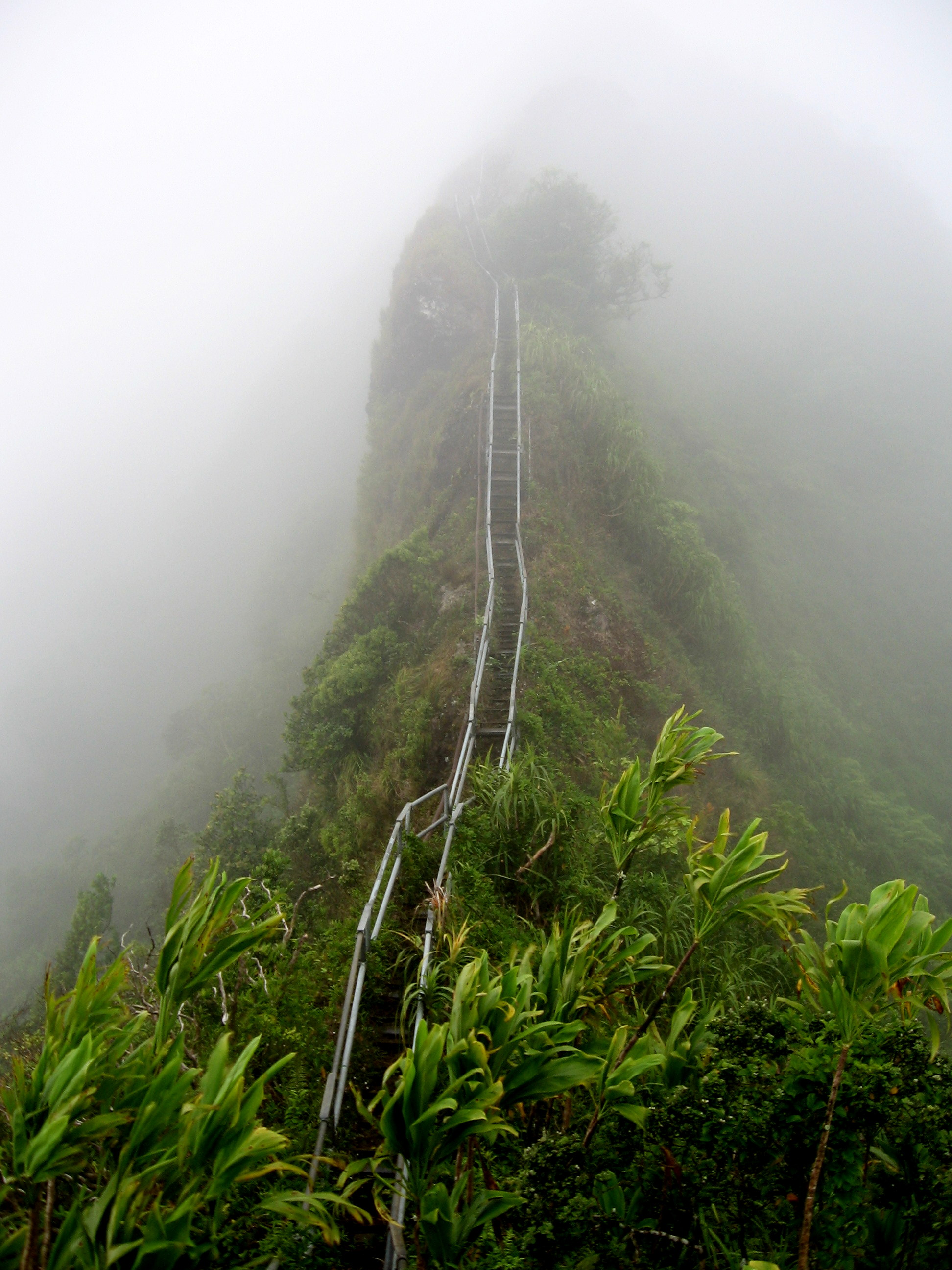
Haʻikū Stairs, 2007

The Haʻikū Stairs, also known as the Stairway to Heaven or Haʻikū Ladder, is a steep, steel step structure. It provided pedestrian access to former U.S. Navy communication facilities on the island of Oʻahu, Hawaii with more than 3,000 steps along O‘ahu's Ko'olau mountain range. The pathway has been used as a hiking trail at various times but was closed to the public in 1987. The city council voted to remove the stairs in 2021. On April 10, 2024, city officials announced that the removal of the stairs was to begin at the end of that month.

== Early history ==
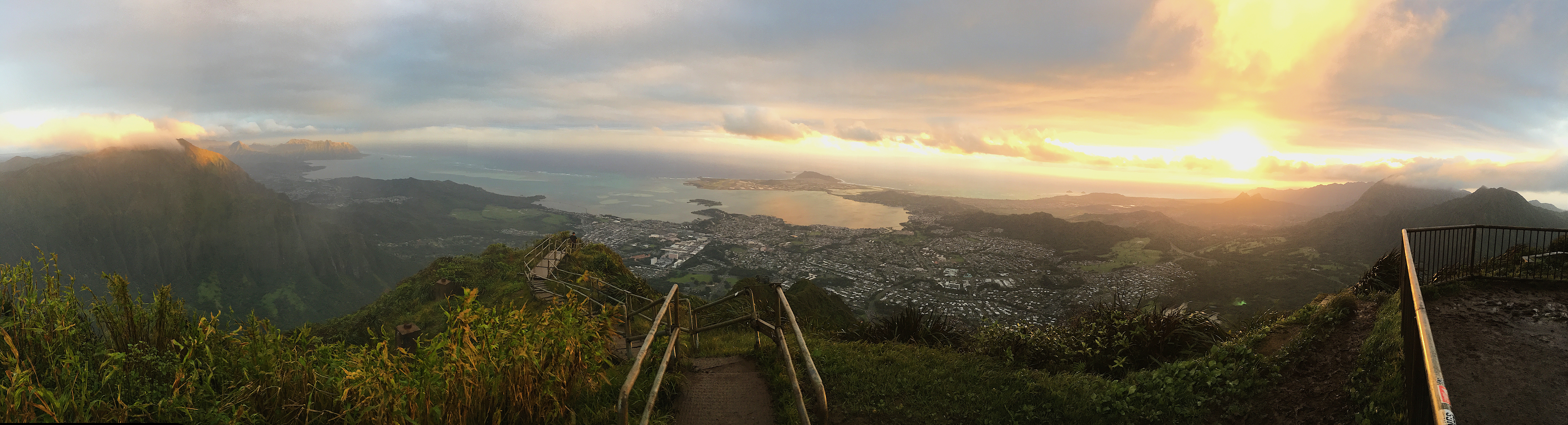
The view from the top of the stairway overlooks Kaneohe as well as Kaneohe Bay.

In 1942, contractors for the U.S. Navy began construction of the Haʻikū Radio Station, a top secret facility that was to be used to transmit radio signals to Navy ships that were then operating throughout the Pacific. In order to obtain the necessary height for the antennae, the Navy stretched them across Haʻikū Valley, a natural amphitheater. Some remains of the wooden ladder may still be seen beside the metal steps.

The radio station was commissioned in 1943. To transmit such a powerful signal, the Navy needed a transmitter of greater capability than possible with vacuum tube technology at the time. They therefore decided upon an Alexanderson alternator, a huge device capable of generating powerful low-frequency radio signals, and requiring a large antenna.

When the Naval Air Station Kaneohe Bay was transferred to the Marine Corps as Marine Corps Air Station Kaneohe Bay in the 1950s, the U.S. Coast Guard used the Haiku Radio Station site for an Omega Navigation System station. In the mid-1950s, the wooden stairs were replaced by sections of metal steps and ramps — by one count, 3,922 steps. The Coast Guard allowed access in the 1970s, but stopped after an appearance on Magnum P.I. increased visitation. The station and trail were closed to the public in 1987.

== 21st century ==
In 2003 with plans to reopen the stairs to the public, they were repaired at a cost to the city of $875,000. With no public access available, nearby residents experienced trespassing and litter on their property. In early 2018, the City and County of Honolulu stated that there was no plan to open the stairs for public use, citing liability concerns. Some hikers ignored the "no trespassing" signs and continued to climb, contributing to the local community's misgivings about reopening the structure.

In 2020, the Board of Water Supply released a final environmental impact statement that evaluated alternatives. The process collected comments through small-group and public meetings with various agencies, landowners, community organizations, and individuals. It estimated that removal of the stairs could cost as much as $1 million. The board voted unanimously on April 27, 2020 to transfer the Haʻikū Stairs over to the city since the stairs were a liability that did not align with the agency's mission. The city had 18 months to take over or the stairs would be torn down. The city anticipated operating the trail as a paid attraction.

The city took possession of the stairs on July 1, 2020. After consideration of the significant liability and maintenance expense for the city, along with the impact to the quality of life of nearby residents, the city manager was urged to remove the stairs by non-binding Resolution 21-154, which was unanimously passed by the city council in September 2021. The budgeted cost to remove the stairs grew to $1.3 million. Friends of Haiku Stairs, a volunteer group aimed at preserving the trail, objected to the decision, saying they have a plan managing safe public access and trespassing at no taxpayer cost. The mayor said that removal will proceed as a high-use tourist attraction is inappropriate with an entrance through a residential neighborhood that lacks the room for necessary facilities such as parking. The city announced in April 2024 that the nearly $2.6 million removal process would begin by the end of the month. The contract to remove the stairs was awarded to Nakoa Companies, Inc. As of April 16, 2024, it has been announced that it will be demolished. Honolulu Mayor Rick Blangiardi said "I can promise you that this was not a capricious decision". As crews began the dismantling process to prepare the stair sections to be flown out by helicopter, the police gave out citations to people attempting to ascend the trail by entering a construction area.

On June 12, 2025 non-profit Friends of Haʻikū Stairs filed a lawsuit, asking the court to reverse the decision to demolish the Haʻikū Stairs.

== Incidents ==
In August 2012, Don Tiki show singer and comedian Fritz Hasenpusch died of a heart attack during his Haʻikū Stair climb. There have never been any serious injuries or deaths due to an accident on the stairs.

There have been several other minor injuries over the years, and between 2021 and 2022, there were more injuries and rescues of hikers trying to access the top of the stairs through the hiking trail via the Moanalua ridge, which is longer and more difficult, resulting in many hikers being rescued near the Haʻikū Stairs and not on the stairs themselves.

In 2014, six people were arrested and 135 were cited for climbing the stairs. The City Prosecutors Office said that criminal trespass in the second degree carries a $1000 fine.

In late August to early September 2024, fourteen people were arrested for accessing the stairs. Everyone arrested was charged with criminal trespassing, a misdemeanor that can result in up to 30 days in jail. Eight of the fourteen were arrested on September 3, although it was not clear if they hiked together.
