= Haʻikū Valley =

Valley in Oʻahu, Hawaii, US

Coordinates: 21°24′19″N 157°49′54″W

Haʻikū Valley is an amphitheater-shaped valley on the windward side of the Koʻolau Range behind Kāneʻohe, Oʻahu in the Hawaiian Islands. The valley was the site of a United States Navy radio transmitting station (later taken over by the Coast Guard as an OMEGA Navigation System station) and is part of the route of Hawaii's Interstate H-3.

The Haʻikū Stairs (also known as "Stairway to Heaven") is a foot trail of over 3,000 metal stairs which ascends to Puʻu Keahiakahoe, a 2,800-foot (850 m) peak above the east valley wall. The stairs were originally constructed as a means of reaching the radio antenna attachment points high on the surrounding ridge line. The trail starts at an elevation of 480 feet (150 m) and covers an approximate horizontal distance of 4,500 feet (1,400 m) for an average slope of about 30 degrees (however, some sections are nearly vertical). The Haʻikū Stairs are closed to the public, although people still illegally trespass to experience the nearly two-hour climb.

The facility initially was built following the attack on Pearl Harbor as a means of communicating with U.S. Navy ships as far away as Tokyo Bay. The facility had a massive antenna system consisting of five massive cable antennas draped from atop one mountain ridge, and across the mountain valley to the top of the other ridge. The ridges formed a horseshoe shape around the valley. The natural height of the mountain ridges made for an excellent means of having an elevated antenna system. The construction and use of the facility was initially a classified military secret.

The walls of the main building were over 5 feet (1.5 m) thick and made of concrete. The building was designed to withstand a 500-pound (230 kg) bomb being dropped on the top of the building, allowing people inside to survive.
