= Rho Theta Navigation =

Rho-theta is a term used in aviation navigation for a location method (or even a group of locating methods) based on the measurement of coordinates (direction and distance to a ground station beacon or beacons ). Many automated Aids to Navigation, such as a VORTAC, use the Rho-Theta data as the primary method to calculate relative position of an aircraft to the reference beacon(s). Rho-Theta methodology is a key component in Area Navigation (RNAV).

The term "Rho-Theta" consists of the two Greek letters corresponding to Rho and Theta:

- Rho (Greek ρ) as a synonym for distance measurement, e.g. Rho would be the equivalent to the English abbreviation "R" for Range
- Theta (Greek θ) for the associated heading (direction or bearing) measurement.
