= List of acts of the 106th United States Congress =

The list of acts of the 106th United States Congress includes all Acts of Congress and ratified treaties by the 106th United States Congress, which lasted from January 3, 1999 to January 3, 2001.

Acts include public and private laws, which are enacted after being passed by Congress and signed by the President, however if the President vetoes a bill it can still be enacted by a two-thirds vote in both houses. The Senate alone considers treaties, which are ratified by a two-thirds vote.

The number of women representatives who served in the 106th Congress was twice the number of women representatives who served in the 101st Congress.

== Summary of actions ==
President William J. Clinton vetoed the following acts of this Congress.

Legislation (Linked to Congress.gov)	Date of veto	Official short title	Outcome
H.R. 2488	September 23, 1999	Taxpayer Refund and Relief Act of 1999	H. Doc. 106–130. (1999 Congressional Record, Vol. 145, Page H8613 ) Veto unchallenged.
H.R. 2587	September 28, 1999	District of Columbia Appropriations Act, 2000	H. Doc. 106–135. (1999 Congressional Record, Vol. 145, Page H8941 ) Veto unchallenged. (Similar provisions enacted in 113 Stat. 1501, Pub. L. 106–113 (text) (PDF); see Item No. 2544 (H.R. 3064) for veto of similar legislation).
H.R. 2606	September 18, 1999	Foreign Operations, Export Financing, and Related Programs Appropriations Act, 2000	H. Doc. 106–145. (1999 Congressional Record, Vol. 145, Page H10142 ) Veto unchallenged.
H.R. 2670	September 25, 1999	Departments of Commerce, Justice, and State, the Judiciary, and related Agencies Appropriations Act, 2000	H. Doc. 106–148. (1999 Congressional Record, Vol. 145, Page H10835 ) Veto unchallenged. (Similar provisions enacted in 113 Stat. 1501, Pub. L. 106–113 (text) (PDF)).
H.R. 3064	November 3, 1999	FY 2000 District of Columbia and Departments of Labor, Health and Human Services, and Education, and related Agencies Appropriations Bill	H. Doc. 106–154. (1999 Congressional Record, Vol. 145, Page H11441 ) Veto unchallenged. (Similar provisions enacted in 113 Stat. 1501, Pub. L. 106–113 (text) (PDF)). See Item No. 2541 (H.R. 2587) for veto of similar legislation).
S. 1287	April 25, 2000	Nuclear Waste Policy Amendments Act of 2000	S. Doc. 106–19. (2000 Congressional Record, Vol. 146, Page S3017 ) Veto sustained. The Senate sustained the veto on May 2, 2000 by a vote of 64 yeas to 35 nays. (145 Cong. Rec. S3229).
H.R. 8	August 31, 2000	Death Tax Elimination Act of 2000	H. Doc. 106–292. (2000 Congressional Record, Vol. 146, Page H7240 ) Veto sustained. The House sustained the veto on September 7, 2000 by a vote of 274 yeas to 157 nays. (146 Cong. Rec. H7335).
H.R. 4392	November 4, 2000	Intelligence Authorization Act, FY 2001	H. Doc. 106–309. (2000 Congressional Record, Vol. 146, Page H11852 ) Veto unchallenged. (Similar provisions enacted in 114 Stat. 2831, Pub. L. 106–567 (text) (PDF)).
H.R. 4516	October 30, 2000	Legislative Branch Appropriations, FY 2001	H. Doc. 106–306. (2000 Congressional Record, Vol. 146, Page H11675 ) Veto unchallenged. (Similar provisions enacted in 114 Stat. 2763, Pub. L. 106–554 (text) (PDF)).
H.R. 4733	October 7, 2000	Energy and Water Development Appropriations Act, 2001	H. Doc. 106–299. (2000 Congressional Record, Vol. 146, Page H9575 ) Veto sustained. The House overrode the veto on October 11, 2000 by a vote of 315 yeas to 98 nays. (146 Cong. Rec. H9669). The Senate received the veto message from the House and referred it to the Committee on Appropriations on October 11, 2000. (146 Cong. Rec. S10228–9). (Similar provisions enacted in 114 Stat. 1441, Pub. L. 106–377 (text) (PDF)).
H.R. 4810	August 5, 2000	Marriage Tax Relief Reconciliation Act of 2000	H. Doc. 106–291. (2000 Congressional Record, Vol. 146, Page H7239 ) Veto sustained. The House sustained the veto on September 13, 2000 by a vote of 270 yeas to 158 nays. (146 Cong Rec. H7520).
H.R. 2415	December 15, 2000	Bankruptcy Reform Act of 2000	Pocket veto occurred after the 2d session of the 106th Congress adjourned sine die on December 15, 2000. The bill was presented to the President on December 7, 2000. A Memorandum of Disapproval was printed at 56 Weekly Comp. of Pres. Doc. 3130, December 25, 2000.

== Public laws ==
Public law number (Linked to Wikisource)	Date of enactment	Official short title	Description	Link to Legislink.org
106-1	March 5, 1999	District of Columbia Management Restoration Act of 1999	To restore the management and personnel authority of the Mayor of the District of Columbia	Pub. L. 106–1 (text) (PDF)
106-2	March 15, 1999	(No short title)	An act to nullify any reservation of funds during fiscal year 1999 for guaranteed loans under the Consolidated Farm and Rural Development Act for qualified beginning farmers or ranchers, and for other purposes	Pub. L. 106–2 (text) (PDF)
106-3	March 23, 1999	(No short title)	An act to deem as timely filed, and process for payment, the applications submitted by the Dodson School Districts for certain Impact Aid payments for fiscal year 1999	Pub. L. 106–3 (text) (PDF)
106-4	March 25, 1999	Nursing Home Resident Protection Amendments of 1999	To amend title XIX of the Social Security Act to prohibit transfers or discharges of residents of nursing facilities as a result of a voluntary withdrawal from participation in the Medicaid Program	Pub. L. 106–4 (text) (PDF)
106-5	March 30, 1999	(No short title)	An act to extend for 3 additional months the period for which chapter 12 of title 11 of the United States Code is reenacted	Pub. L. 106–5 (text) (PDF)
106-6	March 31, 1999	Interim Federal Aviation Administration Authorization Act	A bill to authorize the Airport Improvement Program for 2 months, and for other purposes; Airport Improvement Program Extension bill; Federal Aviation Administration Authorization bill	Pub. L. 106–6 (text) (PDF)
106-7	April 1, 1999	(No short title)	An act to protect producers of agricultural commodities who applied for a Crop Revenue Coverage PLUS supplemental endorsement for the 1999 crop year	Pub. L. 106–7 (text) (PDF)
106-8	April 2, 1999	Small Business Year 2000 Readiness Act	A bill to provide for a loan guarantee program to address the Year 2000 computer problems of small business concerns, and for other purposes; Small Business Y2K bill; Y2K Small Business bill	Pub. L. 106–8 (text) (PDF)
106-9	April 5, 1999	Small Business Investment Improvement Act of 1999	To amend section 20 of the Small Business Act and make technical corrections in Title III of the Small Business Investment Act; Small Business Investment Company Technical Corrections Act of 1999; Small Business Investment Company Technical Corrections bill	Pub. L. 106–9 (text) (PDF)
106-10	April 5, 1999	(No short title)	An act to designate the Federal building and United States courthouse located at 251 North Main Street in Winston-Salem, North Carolina, as the "Hiram H. Ward Federal Building and United States Courthouse"	Pub. L. 106–10 (text) (PDF)
106-11	April 5, 1999	(No short title)	An act to designate the Federal Courthouse located at 316 North 26th Street in Billings, Montana, as the "James F. Battin Federal Courthouse"	Pub. L. 106–11 (text) (PDF)
106-12	April 5, 1999	(No short title)	An act to designate the Federal building located at 700 East San Antonio Street in El Paso, Texas, as the "Richard C. White Federal Building"	Pub. L. 106–12 (text) (PDF)
106-13	April 5, 1999	(No short title)	An act to designate the Federal building located at 1301 Clay Street in Oakland, California, as the "Ronald V. Dellums Federal Building"	Pub. L. 106–13 (text) (PDF)
106-14	April 6, 1999	(No short title)	Providing for the reappointment of Barber B. Conable, Jr. as a citizen regent of the Board of Regents of the Smithsonian Institution	Pub. L. 106–14 (text) (PDF)
106-15	April 6, 1999	(No short title)	Providing for the reappointment of Dr. Hanna H. Gray as a citizen regent of the Board of Regents of the Smithsonian Institution	Pub. L. 106–15 (text) (PDF)
106-16	April 6, 1999	(No short title)	Providing for the reappointment of Wesley S. Williams, Jr. as a citizen regent of the Board of Regents of the Smithsonian Institution	Pub. L. 106–16 (text) (PDF)
106-17	April 6, 1999	Women's Business Center Amendments Act of 1999	To amend the Small Business Act to change the conditions of participation and provide an authorization of appropriations for the women's business center program	Pub. L. 106–17 (text) (PDF)
106-18	April 8, 1999	(No short title)	An act to authorize appropriations for the Coastal Heritage Trail Route in New Jersey, and for other purposes	Pub. L. 106–18 (text) (PDF)
106-19	April 8, 1999	(No short title)	An act to make technical corrections with respect to the monthly reports submitted by the Postmaster General on official mail of the House of Representatives	Pub. L. 106–19 (text) (PDF)
106-20	April 9, 1999	Sudbury, Assabet, and Concord Wild and Scenic River Act	To designate a portion of the Sudbury, Assabet, and Concord Rivers as a component of the National Wild and Scenic Rivers System	Pub. L. 106–20 (text) (PDF)
106-21	April 19, 1999	(No short title)	An act to extend the tax benefits available with respect to services performed in a combat zone to services performed in the Federal Republic of Yugoslavia (Serbia/Montenegro) and certain other areas, and for other purposes	Pub. L. 106–21 (text) (PDF)
106-22	April 27, 1999	Microloan Program Technical Corrections Act of 1999	To make technical corrections to the Microloan Program	Pub. L. 106–22 (text) (PDF)
106-23	April 27, 1999	Terry Sanford Commemoration Act of 1999	To designate the Federal building located at 310 New Bern Avenue in Raleigh, North Carolina, as the "Terry Sanford Federal Building"	Pub. L. 106–23 (text) (PDF)
106-24	April 27, 1999	(No short title)	An act to authorize the establishment of a disaster mitigation pilot program in the Small Business Administration	Pub. L. 106–24 (text) (PDF)
106-25	April 29, 1999	Education Flexibility Partnership Act of 1999	To provide for education flexibility partnerships; Ed-Flex bill; Education Flexibility bill	Pub. L. 106–25 (text) (PDF)
106-26	May 4, 1999	(No short title)	An act to authorize the President to award a gold medal on behalf of the Congress to Rosa Parks in recognition of her contributions to the Nation	Pub. L. 106–26 (text) (PDF)
106-27	May 13, 1999	(No short title)	An act to designate the Federal building located at 709 West 9th Street in Juneau, Alaska, as the "Hurff A. Saunders Federal Building"	Pub. L. 106–27 (text) (PDF)
106-28	May 13, 1999	(No short title)	An act to designate the United States courthouse located at 401 South Michigan Street in South Bend, Indiana, as the "Robert K. Rodibaugh United States Bankruptcy Courthouse"	Pub. L. 106–28 (text) (PDF)
106-29	May 21, 1999	(No short title)	An act to designate the North/South Center as the Dante B. Fascell North-South Center	Pub. L. 106–29 (text) (PDF)
106-30	May 21, 1999	(No short title)	An act to amend the Peace Corps Act to authorize appropriations for fiscal years 2000 through 2003 to carry out that Act, and for other purposes	Pub. L. 106–30 (text) (PDF)
106-31	May 21, 1999	Emergency Supplemental Appropriations Act for Fiscal Year 1999	Making emergency supplemental appropriations for the fiscal year ending September 30, 1999, and for other purposes; Emergency Oil and Gas Guaranteed Loan Program Act; Emergency Steel Loan Guarantee Act of 1999; Emergency Supplemental Appropriations Act for Fiscal Year 1999; Disaster Relief bill; Emergency Supplemental Appropriations bill; Mid-year Spending bill	Pub. L. 106–31 (text) (PDF)
106-32	June 1, 1999	(No short title)	An act to declare a portion of the James River and Kanawha Canal in Richmond, Virginia, to be nonnavigable waters of the United States for purposes of title 46, United States Code, and the other maritime laws of the United States	Pub. L. 106–32 (text) (PDF)
106-33	June 7, 1999	(No short title)	An act to designate the Federal building and United States courthouse located at 18 Greenville Street in Newnan, Georgia, as the "Lewis R. Morgan Federal Building and United States Courthouse"	Pub. L. 106–33 (text) (PDF)
106-34	June 8, 1999	Fastener Quality Act Amendments Act of 1999	To amend the Fastener Quality Act to strengthen the protection against the sale of mismarked, misrepresented, and counterfeit fasteners and eliminate unnecessary requirements, and for other purposes	Pub. L. 106–34 (text) (PDF)
106-35	June 15, 1999	Western Hemisphere Drug Elimination Technical Corrections Act	To amend the Omnibus Consolidated and Emergency Supplemental Appropriations Act, 1999, to make a technical correction relating to an emergency supplemental appropriation for international narcotics control and law enforcement assistance	Pub. L. 106–35 (text) (PDF)
106-36	June 25, 1999	Miscellaneous Trade and Technical Corrections Act of 1999	To make miscellaneous and technical changes to various trade laws, and for other purposes; Trade bill	Pub. L. 106–36 (text) (PDF)
106-37	July 20, 1999	Y2K Act	To establish certain procedures for civil actions brought for damages relating to the failure of any device or system to process or otherwise deal with the transition from the year 1999 to the year 2000, and for other purposes; Small Business Year 2000 Readiness Act; Year 2000 Readiness and Responsibility Act; Y2K Dispute Resolution bill	Pub. L. 106–37 (text) (PDF)
106-38	July 22, 1999	National Missile Defense Act of 1999	To declare it to be the policy of the United States to deploy a national missile defense; Missile Defense bill	Pub. L. 106–38 (text) (PDF)
106-39	July 28, 1999	(No short title)	An act to correct errors in the authorizations of certain programs administered by the National Highway Traffic Administration	Pub. L. 106–39 (text) (PDF)
106-40	August 5, 1999	Chemical Safety Information, Site Security and Fuels Regulatory Relief Act	A bill to amend the Clean Air Act to remove flammable fuels from the list of substances with respect to which reporting and other activities are required under the risk management plan program; An Act to amend the Clean Air Act to remove flammable fuels from the list of substances with respect to which reporting and other activities are required under the risk management plan program, and for other purposes; Fuels Regulatory Relief Act	Pub. L. 106–40 (text) (PDF)
106-41	August 5, 1999	Lake Oconee Land Exchange Act	A bill to direct the Secretary of Agriculture to complete a land exchange with Georgia Power Company	Pub. L. 106–41 (text) (PDF)
106-42	August 5, 1999	Patent Fee Integrity and Innovation Protection Act of 1999	A bill to authorize funds for the payment of salaries and expenses of the Patent and Trademark Office, and for other purposes; Patent Fee Integrity and Innovation Protection Act of 1999	Pub. L. 106–42 (text) (PDF)
106-43	August 5, 1999	Trademark Amendments Act of 1999	A bill to amend the Trademark Act of 1946 relating to dilution of famous marks, and for other purposes	Pub. L. 106–43 (text) (PDF)
106-44	August 5, 1999	(No short title)	An act to make technical corrections in title 17, United States Code, and other laws	Pub. L. 106–44 (text) (PDF)
106-45	August 10, 1999	(No short title)	An act to preserve the cultural resources of the Route 66 corridor and to authorize the Secretary of the Interior to provide assistance	Pub. L. 106–45 (text) (PDF)
106-46	August 11, 1999	(No short title)	An act to clarify the quorum requirement for the Board of Directors of the Export-Import Bank of the United States	Pub. L. 106–46 (text) (PDF)
106-47	August 13, 1999	(No short title)	An act to amend the Agricultural Adjustment Act of 1938 to release and protect the release of tobacco production and marketing information	Pub. L. 106–47 (text) (PDF)
106-48	August 17, 1999	(No short title)	An act to designate the Federal building and United States courthouse located at West 920 Riverside Avenue in Spokane, Washington, as the "Thomas S. Foley Federal Building and United States Courthouse", and the plaza at the south entrance of such building and courthouse as the "Walter F. Horan Plaza"	Pub. L. 106–48 (text) (PDF)
106-49	August 17, 1999	Construction Industry Payment Protection Act of 1999	To amend the Office of Federal Procurement Policy Act and the Miller Act, relating to payment protections for persons providing labor and materials for Federal construction projects	Pub. L. 106–49 (text) (PDF)
106-50	August 17, 1999	Veterans Entrepreneurship and Small Business Development Act of 1999	To provide technical, financial, and procurement assistance to veteran owned small businesses, and for other purposes	Pub. L. 106–50 (text) (PDF)
106-51	August 17, 1999	Emergency Steel Loan Guarantee and Emergency Oil and Gas Guaranteed Loan Act of 1999	An Act providing emergency authority for guarantees of loans to qualified steel and iron ore companies and to qualified oil and gas companies, and for other purposes; Making emergency supplemental appropriations for military operations, refugee relief, and humanitarian assistance relating to the conflict in Kosovo, and for military operations in Southwest Asia for the fiscal year ending September 30, 1999, and for other purposes; Emergency Oil and Gas Guaranteed Loan Program Act; Emergency Steel Loan Guarantee Act of 1999; Kosovo and Southwest Asia Emergency Supplemental Appropriations Act, 1999; Emergency Oil and Gas Guaranteed Loan Program; Emergency Steel Loan Guarantee Act; Kosovo Emergency Supplemental Appropriations bill	Pub. L. 106–51 (text) (PDF)
106-52	August 17, 1999	Military Construction Appropriations Act, 2000	Making appropriations for military construction, family housing, and base realignment and closure for the Department of Defense for the fiscal year ending September 30, 2000, and for other purposes; Appropriations bill FY2000, Military Construction; Military Construction FY2000 Appropriations bill	Pub. L. 106–52 (text) (PDF)
106-53	August 17, 1999	Water Resources Development Act of 1999	A bill to provide for the conservation and development of water and related resources, to authorize the Secretary of the Army to construct various projects for improvements to rivers and harbors of the United States, and for other purposes; Water Projects bill	Pub. L. 106–53 (text) (PDF)
106-54	August 17, 1999	(No short title)	An act for the relief of Global Exploration and Development Corporation, Kerr-McGee Corporation, and Kerr-McGee Chemical, LLC (successor to Kerr-McGee Chemical Corporation), and for other purposes	Pub. L. 106–54 (text) (PDF)
106-55	August 17, 1999	(No short title)	An act to amend the International Religious Freedom Act of 1998 to provide additional administrative authorities to the United States Commission on International Religious Freedom, and to make technical corrections to that Act, and for other purposes	Pub. L. 106–55 (text) (PDF)
106-56	September 24, 1999	Organ Donor Leave Act	To amend title 5, United States Code, to increase the amount of leave time available to a Federal employee in any year in connection with serving as an organ donor, and for other purposes	Pub. L. 106–56 (text) (PDF)
106-57	September 29, 1999	Legislative Branch Appropriations Act, 2000	Making appropriations for the Legislative Branch for the fiscal year ending September 30, 2000, and for other purposes; Congressional Operations Appropriations Act, 2000; Legislative Branch Supplemental Appropriations Act, 1999; FY2000 Legislative Branch Appropriations bill	Pub. L. 106–57 (text) (PDF)
106-58	September 29, 1999	Treasury and General Government Appropriations Act, 2000	Making appropriations for the Treasury Department, the United States Postal Service, the Executive Office of the President, and certain Independent Agencies, for the fiscal year ending September 30, 2000, and for other purposes; Executive Office Appropriations Act, 2000; Federal Employees Child Care Act; Independent Agencies Appropriations Act, 2000; Postal Service Appropriations Act, 2000; Treasury Department Appropriations Act, 2000; Appropriations bill FY2000, Treasury, Postal Service; Postal Service FY2000 Appropriations bill	Pub. L. 106–58 (text) (PDF)
106-59	September 29, 1999	(No short title)	An act to extend through the end of the current fiscal year certain expiring Federal Aviation Administration authorizations	Pub. L. 106–59 (text) (PDF)
106-60	September 29, 1999	Energy and Water Development Appropriations Act, 2000	Making appropriations for energy and water development for the fiscal year ending September 30, 2000, and for other purposes; Appropriations bill FY2000, Energy and Water Development; Energy FY2000 Appropriations bill; Water Development FY2000 Appropriations bill	Pub. L. 106–60 (text) (PDF)
106-61	September 29, 1999	(No short title)	Congratulating and commending the Veterans of Foreign Wars	Pub. L. 106–61 (text) (PDF)
106-62	September 30, 1999	Making continuing appropriations for the fiscal year 2000, and for other purposes	Continuing Appropriation FY2000 (First)	Pub. L. 106–62 (text) (PDF)
106-63	October 1, 1999	(No short title)	An act to reauthorize the Congressional Award Act	Pub. L. 106–63 (text) (PDF)
106-64	October 5, 1999	(No short title)	An act to extend energy conservation programs under the Energy Policy and Conservation Act through March 31, 2000	Pub. L. 106–64 (text) (PDF)
106-65	October 5, 1999	National Defense Authorization Act for Fiscal Year 2000	An original bill to authorize appropriations for fiscal year 2000 for military activities of the Department of Defense, for military construction, and for defense activities of the Department of Energy, to prescribe personnel strengths for such fiscal year for the Armed Forces, and for other purposes; Department of Energy Facilities Safeguards, Security, and Counterintelligence Enhancement Act of 1999; Maritime Administration Authorization Act for Fiscal Year 2000; Military Construction Authorization Act for Fiscal Year 2000; Military Lands Withdrawal Act of 1999; Military Lands Withdrawal Renewal Act of 1999; Military Voting Rights Act of 1999; National Nuclear Security Administration Act; National Security Information Protection Improvement Act; Panama Canal Commission Authorization Act for Fiscal Year 2000; Troops-to-Teachers Program Act of 1999; Defense and Military Construction Authorization bill, FY2000; FY2000 Defense Authorization bill	Pub. L. 106–65 (text) (PDF)
106-66	October 6, 1999	Troops-to-Teachers Program Act of 1999	An act to direct the Secretaries of Agriculture and Interior and to convey certain lands in San Juan County, New Mexico, to San Juan College	Pub. L. 106–66 (text) (PDF)
106-67	October 6, 1999	(No short title)	An Act to amend Public Law 105-188 to provide for the mineral leasing of certain Indian lands in Oklahoma.	Pub. L. 106–67 (text) (PDF)
106-68	October 6, 1999	(No short title)	An act to make certain technical and other corrections relating to the Centennial of Flight Commemoration Act (36 U.S.C. 143 note; 112 Stat. 3486 et seq.)	Pub. L. 106–68 (text) (PDF)
106-69	October 9, 1999	Department of Transportation and Related Agencies Appropriations Act, 2000	Making appropriations for the Department of Transportation and related agencies for the fiscal year ending September 30, 2000, and for other purposes; Department of Transportation Appropriations Act, FY2000; Transportation Department FY2000 Appropriations bill	Pub. L. 106–69 (text) (PDF)
106-70	October 9, 1999	(No short title)	An act to extend for 9 additional months the period for which chapter 12 of title 11, United States Code, is reenacted	Pub. L. 106–70 (text) (PDF)
106-71	October 12, 1999	Missing, Exploited, and Runaway Children Protection Act	A bill to provide funding for the National Center for Missing and Exploited Children, to reauthorize the Runaway and Homeless Youth Act, and for other purposes; Missing Children Protection bill	Pub. L. 106–71 (text) (PDF)
106-72	October 19, 1999	(No short title)	An act to designate the Federal building located at 300 East 8th Street in Austin, Texas, as the "J.J. "Jake" Pickle Federal Building"	Pub. L. 106–72 (text) (PDF)
106-73	October 19, 1999	(No short title)	An act to provide for interim continuation of administration of motor carrier functions by the Federal Highway Administration	Pub. L. 106–73 (text) (PDF)
106-74	October 20, 1999	Departments of Veterans Affairs and Housing and Urban Development, and Independent Agencies Appropriations Act, 2000	Making appropriations for the Departments of Veterans Affairs and Housing and Urban Development, and for sundry independent agencies, boards, commissions, corporations, and offices for the fiscal year ending September 30, 2000, and for other purposes; Preserving Affordable Housing for Senior Citizens and Families into the 21st Century Act; Appropriations bill FY2000, HUD; Appropriations bill FY2000, Veterans Affairs, HUD; Housing and Urban Development FY2000 Appropriations bill; Veterans Affairs FY2000 Appropriations bill	Pub. L. 106–74 (text) (PDF)
106-75	October 21, 1999	Making further continuing appropriations for the fiscal year 2000, and for other purposes	Continuing Appropriation FY2000 (Second)	Pub. L. 106–75 (text) (PDF)
106-76	October 21, 1999	Black Canyon of the Gunnison National Park and Gunnison Gorge National Conservation Area Act of 1999	A bill to redesignate the Black Canyon of the Gunnison National Monument as a national park and establish the Gunnison Gorge National Conservation Area, and for other purposes; Black Canyon National Park and Gunnison Gorge National Conservation Area Act of 1999	Pub. L. 106–76 (text) (PDF)
106-77	October 22, 1999	(No short title)	An act to designate the Federal building located at 300 Recinto Sur Street in Old San Juan, Puerto Rico, as the "Jose V. Toledo United States Post Office and Courthouse"	Pub. L. 106–77 (text) (PDF)
106-78	October 22, 1999	Agriculture, Rural Development, Food and Drug Administration, and Related Agencies Appropriations Act, 2000	Making appropriations for Agriculture, Rural Development, Food and Drug Administration, and Related Agencies for the fiscal year ending September 30, 2000, and for other purposes; Livestock Mandatory Reporting Act of 1999; FY2000 Agriculture Appropriations bill	Pub. L. 106–78 (text) (PDF)
106-79	October 25, 1999	Department of Defense Appropriations Act, 2000	Making appropriations for the Department of Defense for the fiscal year ending September 30, 2000, and for other purposes; McGregor Range Withdrawal Act; Military Lands Withdrawal Renewal Act of 1999; FY2000 Defense Appropriations bill	Pub. L. 106–79 (text) (PDF)
106-80	October 25, 1999	(No short title)	An act to amend title 4, United States Code, to add the Martin Luther King Jr. holiday to the list of days on which the flag should especially be displayed	Pub. L. 106–80 (text) (PDF)
106-81	October 26, 1999	Wireless Communications and Public Safety Act of 1999	A bill to promote and enhance public safety through the use of 9-1-1 as the universal emergency assistance number, further deployment of wireless 9-1-1 service, support of States in upgrading 9-1-1 capabilities and related functions, encouragement of construction and operation of seamless, ubiquitous, and reliable networks for personal wireless services, and for other purposes; Wireless Universal Emergency Phone Number bill	Pub. L. 106–81 (text) (PDF)
106-82	October 27, 1999	(No short title)	An act to provide for the conveyance of certain property from the United States to Stanislaus County, California	Pub. L. 106–82 (text) (PDF)
106-83	October 28, 1999	National Medal of Honor Memorial Act	To designate as a national memorial the memorial being built at the Riverside National Cemetery in Riverside, California to honor recipients of the Medal of Honor	Pub. L. 106–83 (text) (PDF)
106-84	October 28, 1999	(No short title)	An act to amend the Revised Organic Act of the Virgin Islands to provide for greater fiscal autonomy consistent with other United States jurisdictions, and for other purposes	Pub. L. 106–84 (text) (PDF)
106-85	October 29, 1999	Making further continuing appropriations for the fiscal year 2000, and for other purposes	Continuing Appropriation FY2000 (Third)	Pub. L. 106–85 (text) (PDF)
106-86	October 31, 1999	Pennsylvania Battlefields Protection Act of 1999	An act to authorize appropriations for the protection of Paoli and Brandywine Battlefields in Pennsylvania, to authorize the Valley Forge Museum of the American Revolution at Valley Forge National Historical Park, and for other purposes; To authorize appropriations for the protection of Paoli and Brandywine Battlefields in Pennsylvania, to direct the National Park Service to conduct a special resource study of Paoli and Brandywine Battlefields, to authorize the Valley Forge Museum of the American Revolution at Valley Forge National Historical Park, and for other purposes; PATRIOT Act; Protect America's Treasures of the Resolution for Independence for Our Tomorrow Act; Protect America's Treasures of the Revolution for Independence for Our Tomorrow Act; Valley Forge Museum of the American Revolution Act of 1999	Pub. L. 106–86 (text) (PDF)
106-87	November 3, 1999	Torture Victims Relief Reauthorization Act of 1999	To reauthorize a comprehensive program of support for victims of torture	Pub. L. 106–87 (text) (PDF)
106-88	November 5, 1999	Making further continuing appropriations for the fiscal year 2000, and for other purposes	Continuing Appropriation FY2000 (Fourth)	Pub. L. 106–88 (text) (PDF)
106-89	November 8, 1999	Valley Forge Museum of the American Revolution Act of 1999	An act to locate and secure the return of Zachary Baumel, an American citizen, and other Israeli soldiers missing in action	Pub. L. 106–89 (text) (PDF)
106-90	November 8, 1999	(No short title)	An act to grant the consent of Congress to the boundary change between Georgia and South Carolina	Pub. L. 106–90 (text) (PDF)
106-91	November 9, 1999	(No short title)	An act to designate the United States courthouse under construction at 333 Las Vegas Boulevard South in Las Vegas, Nevada, as the "Lloyd D. George United States Courthouse"	Pub. L. 106–91 (text) (PDF)
106-92	November 9, 1999	(No short title)	An act to designate the Old Executive Office Building located at 17th Street and Pennsylvania Avenue, NW, in Washington, District of Columbia, as the Dwight D. Eisenhower Executive Office Building	Pub. L. 106–92 (text) (PDF)
106-93	November 10, 1999	(No short title)	Waiving certain enrollment requirements for the remainder of the first session of the One Hundred Sixth Congress with respect to any bill or joint resolution making general appropriations or continuing appropriations for fiscal year 2000	Pub. L. 106–93 (text) (PDF)
106-94	November 10, 1999	Making further continuing appropriations for the fiscal year 2000, and for other purposes	Continuing Appropriation FY2000 (Fifth)	Pub. L. 106–94 (text) (PDF)
106-95	November 12, 1999	Nursing Relief for Disadvantaged Areas Act of 1999	To amend the Immigration and Nationality Act with respect to the requirements for the admission of nonimmigrant nurses who will practice in health professional shortage areas	Pub. L. 106–95 (text) (PDF)
106-96	November 12, 1999	Export Apple Act	To amend the Export Apple and Pear Act to limit the applicability of the Act to apples	Pub. L. 106–96 (text) (PDF)
106-97	November 12, 1999	(No short title)	An act to authorize a cost of living adjustment in the pay of administrative law judges	Pub. L. 106–97 (text) (PDF)
106-98	November 12, 1999	District of Columbia College Access Act of 1999	To establish a program to afford high school graduates from the District of Columbia the benefits of in-State tuition at State colleges and universities outside the District of Columbia, and for other purposes; District of Columbia College Access Act	Pub. L. 106–98 (text) (PDF)
106-99	November 12, 1999	History of the House Awareness and Preservation Act	To direct the Librarian of Congress to prepare the history of the House of Representatives, and for other purposes	Pub. L. 106–99 (text) (PDF)
106-100	November 12, 1999	District of Columbia College Access Act	An act to permit the enrollment in the House of Representatives Child Care Center of children of Federal employees who are not employees of the legislative branch	Pub. L. 106–100 (text) (PDF)
106-101	November 12, 1999	(No short title)	Granting the consent of Congress to the Missouri-Nebraska Boundary Compact	Pub. L. 106–101 (text) (PDF)
106-102	November 12, 1999	Gramm-Leach-Bliley Act	An Act to enhance competition in the financial services industry by providing a prudential framework for the affiliation of banks, securities firms, and other financial service providers, and for other purposes; An original bill to enhance competition in the financial services industry by providing a prudential framework for the affiliation of banks, securities firms, insurance companies, and other financial service providers, and for other purposes; ATM Fee Reform Act of 1999; Federal Home Loan Bank System Modernization Act of 1999; Financial Information Anti-Fraud Act of 1999; Financial Services Act of 1999; Financial Services Modernization Act of 1999; Prime Act; Program for Investment in Microentrepreneurs Act of 1999; Financial Services Modernization bill	Pub. L. 106–102 (text) (PDF)
106-103	November 13, 1999	Program for Investment in Microentrepreneurs Act of 1999	An act to authorize the construction of a monument to honor those who have served the Nation's civil defense and emergency management programs	Pub. L. 106–103 (text) (PDF)
106-104	November 13, 1999	(No short title)	An act to amend the Immigration and Nationality Act to extend for an additional 2 years the period for admission of an alien as a nonimmigrant under section 101(a)(15)(S) of such Act, and to authorize appropriations for the refugee assistance program under chapter 2 of title IV of the Immigration and Nationality Act	Pub. L. 106–104 (text) (PDF)
106-105	November 18, 1999	Making further continuing appropriations for the fiscal year 2000, and for other purposes	Continuing Appropriation FY2000 (Sixth)	Pub. L. 106–105 (text) (PDF)
106-106	November 19, 1999	Making further continuing appropriations for the fiscal year 2000, and for other purposes	Continuing Appropriation FY2000 (Eighth)	Pub. L. 106–106 (text) (PDF)
106-107	November 20, 1999	Federal Financial Assistance Management Improvement Act of 1999	A bill to improve the effectiveness and performance of Federal financial assistance programs, simplify Federal financial assistance application and reporting requirements, and improve the delivery of services to the public	Pub. L. 106–107 (text) (PDF)
106-108	November 24, 1999	Arctic Tundra Habitat Emergency Conservation Act	To assure the long-term conservation of mid-continent light geese and the biological diversity of the ecosystem upon which many North American migratory birds depend, by directing the Secretary of the Interior to implement rules to reduce the overabundant population of mid-continent light geese; Neotropical Migratory Bird Conservation Act	Pub. L. 106–108 (text) (PDF)
106-109	November 24, 1999	(No short title)	An act to make technical corrections to the Water Resources Development Act of 1999	Pub. L. 106–109 (text) (PDF)
106-110	November 24, 1999	(No short title)	An act to amend part G of title I of the Omnibus Crime Control and Safe Streets Act of 1968 to allow railroad police officers to attend the Federal Bureau of Investigation National Academy for law enforcement training	Pub. L. 106–110 (text) (PDF)
106-111	November 29, 1999	(No short title)	An act to establish designations for United States Postal Service buildings in Philadelphia, Pennsylvania	Pub. L. 106–111 (text) (PDF)
106-112	November 29, 1999	(No short title)	An act to designate the facility of the United States Postal Service at 410 North 6th Street in Garden City, Kansas, as the "Clifford R. Hope Post Office"	Pub. L. 106–112 (text) (PDF)
106-113	November 29, 1999	Consolidated Appropriations Act, 2000	An act making consolidated appropriations for the fiscal year ending September 30, 2000, and for other purposes; Making appropriations for the government of the District of Columbia and other activities chargeable in whole or in part against revenues of said District for the fiscal year ending September 30, 2000, and for other purposes; Making consolidated appropriations for the fiscal year ending September 30, 2000, and for other purposes; Admiral James W. Nance and Meg Donovan Foreign Relations Authorization Act, Fiscal Years 2000 and 2001; American Inventors Protection Act of 1999; Anticybersquatting Consumer Protection Act; Arms Control and Nonproliferation Act of 1999; Arms Control, Nonproliferation, and Security Assistance Act of 1999; Defense Offsets Disclosure Act of 1999; Department of Commerce and Related Agencies Appropriations Act, 2000; Department of Education Appropriations Act, 2000; Department of Health and Human Services Appropriations Act, 2000; Department of Justice Appropriations Act, 2000; Department of Labor Appropriations Act, 2000; Department of State and Related Agency Appropriations Act, 2000; Department of the Interior and Related Agencies Appropriations Act, 2000; Departments of Commerce, Justice, and State, the Judiciary, and Related Agencies Appropriations Act, 2000; Departments of Labor, Health and Human Services, and Education, and Related Agencies Appropriations Act, 2000; District of Columbia Appropriations Act, 2000; Domestic Publication of Foreign Filed Patent Applications Act of 1999; First Inventor Defense Act of 1999; Foreign Operations, Export Financing, and Related Programs Appropriations Act, 2000; Intellectual Property and Communications Omnibus Reform Act of 1999; International Arms Sales Code of Conduct Act of 1999; Inventors' Rights Act of 1999; Judiciary Appropriations Act, 2000; Medicare, Medicaid, and SCHIP Balanced Budget Refinement Act of 1999; Mississippi National Forest Improvement Act of 1999; National Security and Corporate Fairness Under the Biological Weapons Convention Act; North Korea Threat Reduction Act of 1999; Optional Inter Partes Reexamination Procedure Act of 1999; Patent Term Guarantee Act of 1999; Patent and Trademark Fee Fairness Act of 1999; Patent and Trademark Office Efficiency Act; Proliferation Prevention Enhancement Act of 1999; Rural Local Broadcast Signal Act; Satellite Home Viewer Improvement Act of 1999; Secure Embassy Construction and Counterterrorism Act of 1999; Security Assistance Act of 1999; Silk Road Strategy Act of 1999; United Nations Reform Act of 1999; Across-the-Board Rescissions (Spending Cuts) FY2000 Appropriations bill; American Embassy Security bill; Appropriations bill FY2000, Across-the-Board Rescissions (Spending Cuts); Appropriations bill FY2000, Commerce, Justice, State; Appropriations bill FY2000, District of Columbia; Appropriations bill FY2000, Foreign Operations; Appropriations bill FY2000, Interior; Appropriations bill FY2000, Labor, HHS, Education; Appropriations bill FY2000, Miscellaneous; Authorization bill FY2000, State Department; Commerce Department FY2000 Appropriations bill; Consolidated Appropriations Act for FY2000; Cybersquatting bill; District of Columbia FY2000 Appropriations bill; Education Department FY2000 Appropriations bill; FY2000 Consolidated Appropriations bill; Foreign Operations FY2000 Appropriations bill; Health and Human Services FY2000 Appropriations bill; Intellectual Property and Communications Omnibus Reform bill; Interior Department FY2000 Appropriations bill; Justice Department FY2000 Appropriations bill; Labor Department FY2000 Appropriations bill; Medicare, Medicaid, and SCHIP Balanced Budget bill; Medicare, Medicaid, and State Children's Health Insurance Program bill; Milk Marketing Orders bill; Miscellaneous Appropriations bill FY2000; Omnibus Appropriations bill; Satellite Home Viewer bill; State Department FY2000 Appropriations bill; State Department and Foreign Assistance bill	Pub. L. 106–113 (text) (PDF)
106-114	November 29, 1999	(No short title)	An act to direct the Secretary of the Interior to convey certain lands to the county of Rio Arriba, New Mexico	Pub. L. 106–114 (text) (PDF)
106-115	November 29, 1999	Minuteman Missile National Historic Site Establishment Act of 1999	A bill to establish the Minuteman Missile National Historic Site in the State of South Dakota, and for other purposes	Pub. L. 106–115 (text) (PDF)
106-116	November 29, 1999	(No short title)	An act to clarify certain boundaries on maps relating to the Coastal Barrier Resources System	Pub. L. 106–116 (text) (PDF)
106-117	November 30, 1999	Veterans Millennium Health Care and Benefits Act	An act to amend title 38, United States Code, to enhance programs providing health care, education, memorial, and other benefits for veterans, to authorize major medical facility projects for the Department of Veterans Affairs, and for other purposes; To amend title 38, United States Code, to establish a program of extended care services for veterans and to make other improvements in health care programs of the Department of Veterans Affairs; All-Volunteer Force Educational Assistance Programs Improvements Act of 1999; Arlington National Cemetery Burial and Inurnment Eligibility Act of 1999; Court of Appeals for Veterans Claims Amendments of 1999; Department of Veterans Affairs Employment Reduction Assistance Act of 1999; John William Rolen Act; Veterans Benefits Act of 1999; Veterans' Millennium Health Care Act; World War II Memorial Completion Act	Pub. L. 106–117 (text) (PDF)
106-118	November 30, 1999	Veterans' Compensation Cost-of-Living Adjustment Act of 1999	To amend title 38, United States Code, to provide a cost-of-living adjustment in rates of compensation paid for service-connected disabilities, to enhance the compensation, memorial affairs, and housing programs of the Department of Veterans Affairs, to improve retirement authorities applicable to judges of the United States Court of Appeals for Veterans Claims, and for other purposes; Veterans Benefits Improvement Act of 1999	Pub. L. 106–118 (text) (PDF)
106-119	December 3, 1999	Upper Delaware Scenic and Recreational River Mongaup Visitor Center Act of 1999	To authorize the Secretary of the Interior to construct and operate a visitor center for the Upper Delaware Scenic and Recreational River on land owned by the State of New York	Pub. L. 106–119 (text) (PDF)
106-120	December 3, 1999	Intelligence Authorization Act for Fiscal Year 2000	To authorize appropriations for fiscal year 2000 for intelligence and intelligence-related activities of the United States Government, the Community Management Account, and the Central Intelligence Agency Retirement and Disability System, and for other purposes; Department of Energy Sensitive Country Foreign Visitors Moratorium Act; Foreign Narcotics Kingpin Designation Act; Central Intelligence Authorization bill; FY99 Intelligence Authorization bill; Intelligence Authorization bill, FY2000; Foreign Narcotics Kingpin Designation Act	Pub. L. 106–120 (text) (PDF)
106-121	December 6, 1999	(No short title)	An act to extend the deadline under the Federal Power Act for FERC Project No. 9401, the Mt. Hope Waterpower Project	Pub. L. 106–121 (text) (PDF)
106-122	December 6, 1999	(No short title)	An act to amend the Federal Reserve Act to broaden the range of discount window loans which may be used as collateral for Federal reserve notes	Pub. L. 106–122 (text) (PDF)
106-123	December 6, 1999	(No short title)	An act to designate certain facilities of the United States Postal Service in Chicago, Illinois	Pub. L. 106–123 (text) (PDF)
106-124	December 6, 1999	(No short title)	An act to designate the United States Postal Service building located at 8850 South 700 East, Sandy, Utah, as the "Noal Cushing Bateman Post Office Building"	Pub. L. 106–124 (text) (PDF)
106-125	December 6, 1999	(No short title)	An act to designate the United States Postal Service building located at 34480 Highway 101 South in Cloverdale, Oregon, as the "Maurine B. Neuberger United States Post Office"	Pub. L. 106–125 (text) (PDF)
106-126	December 6, 1999	Leif Ericson Millennium Commemorative Coin Act	An act to require the Secretary of the Treasury to mint coins in conjunction with the minting of coins by the Republic of Iceland in commemoration of the millennium of the discovery of the New World by Leif Ericson	Pub. L. 106–126 (text) (PDF)
106-127	December 6, 1999	(No short title)	Appointing the day for the convening of the second session of the One Hundred Sixth Congress	Pub. L. 106–127 (text) (PDF)
106-128	December 6, 1999	(No short title)	An act to direct the Secretary of the Interior to make corrections to a map relating to the Coastal Barrier Resources System	Pub. L. 106–128 (text) (PDF)
106-129	December 6, 1999	Healthcare Research and Quality Act of 1999	A bill to amend title IX of the Public Health Service Act to revise and extend the Agency for Healthcare Policy and Research	Pub. L. 106–129 (text) (PDF)
106-130	December 6, 1999	(No short title)	An act to provide for the holding of court at Natchez, Mississippi in the same manner as court is held at Vicksburg, Mississippi, and for other purposes	Pub. L. 106–130 (text) (PDF)
106-131	December 7, 1999	Gateway Visitor Center Authorization Act of 1999	To authorize the Gateway Visitor Center at Independence National Historical Park, and for other purposes	Pub. L. 106–131 (text) (PDF)
106-132	December 7, 1999	(No short title)	An act to redesignate Great Kills Park in the Gateway National Recreation Area as "World War II Veterans Park at Great Kills"	Pub. L. 106–132 (text) (PDF)
106-133	December 7, 1999	Arizona Statehood and Enabling Act Amendments of 1999	To protect the permanent trust funds of the State of Arizona from erosion due to inflation and modify the basis on which distributions are made from those funds	Pub. L. 106–133 (text) (PDF)
106-134	December 7, 1999	(No short title)	An act to amend the Act that established the Keweenaw National Historical Park to require the Secretary of the Interior to consider nominees of various local interests in appointing members of the Keweenaw National Historical Parks Advisory Commission	Pub. L. 106–134 (text) (PDF)
106-135	December 7, 1999	Star-Spangled Banner National Historic Trail Study Act of 1999	To amend the National Trails System Act to designate the route of the War of 1812 British invasion of Maryland and Washington, District of Columbia, and the route of the American defense, for study for potential addition to the national trails system	Pub. L. 106–135 (text) (PDF)
106-136	December 7, 1999	Perkins County Rural Water System Act of 1999	To authorize the Secretary of the Interior to provide assistance to the Perkins County Rural Water System, Inc., for the construction of water supply facilities in Perkins County, South Dakota	Pub. L. 106–136 (text) (PDF)
106-137	December 7, 1999	(No short title)	Concerning the participation of Taiwan in the World Health Organization (WHO)	Pub. L. 106–137 (text) (PDF)
106-138	December 7, 1999	Terry Peak Land Act of 1999	To provide for the conveyance of certain National Forest System lands in the State of South Dakota; Terry Peak Land Transfer Act of 1999	Pub. L. 106–138 (text) (PDF)
106-139	December 7, 1999	(No short title)	An act to amend the Immigration and Nationality Act to provide that an adopted alien who is less than 18 years of age may be considered a child under such Act if adopted with or after a sibling who is a child under such Act	Pub. L. 106–139 (text) (PDF)
106-140	December 7, 1999	(No short title)	An act to amend the Central Utah Project Completion Act to provide for acquisition of water and water rights for Central Utah Project purposes, completion of Central Utah project facilities, and implementation of water conservation measures	Pub. L. 106–140 (text) (PDF)
106-141	December 7, 1999	State Flexibility Clarification Act	To amend the Congressional Budget Act of 1974 to assist the Congressional Budget Office with the scoring of State and local mandates	Pub. L. 106–141 (text) (PDF)
106-142	December 7, 1999	(No short title)	Commending the World War II veterans who fought in the Battle of the Bulge, and for other purposes	Pub. L. 106–142 (text) (PDF)
106-143	December 7, 1999	Four Corners Interpretive Center Act	A bill to authorize an interpretive center and related visitor facilities within the Four Corners Monument Tribal Park, and for other purposes	Pub. L. 106–143 (text) (PDF)
106-144	December 7, 1999	(No short title)	An act to direct the Secretary of Agriculture to convey the city of Sisters, Oregon, a certain parcel of land for use in connection with a sewage treatment facility	Pub. L. 106–144 (text) (PDF)
106-145	December 9, 1999	Otay Mountain Wilderness Act of 1999	To designate a portion of the Otay Mountain region of California as wilderness	Pub. L. 106–145 (text) (PDF)
106-146	December 9, 1999	Thomas Cole National Historic Site Act	To establish the Thomas Cole National Historic Site in the State of New York as an affiliated area of the National Park System	Pub. L. 106–146 (text) (PDF)
106-147	December 9, 1999	(No short title)	An act to authorize the Secretary of the Interior to transfer administrative jurisdiction over land within the boundaries of the Home of Franklin D. Roosevelt National Historic Site to the Archivist of the United States for the construction of a visitor center	Pub. L. 106–147 (text) (PDF)
106-148	December 9, 1999	National Geologic Mapping Reauthorization Act of 1999	To reauthorize and amend the National Geologic Mapping Act of 1992	Pub. L. 106–148 (text) (PDF)
106-149	December 9, 1999	Quinebaug and Shetucket Rivers Valley National Heritage Corridor Reauthorization Act of 1999	To amend the Quinebaug and Shetucket Rivers Valley National Heritage Corridor Act of 1994 to expand the boundaries of the Corridor	Pub. L. 106–149 (text) (PDF)
106-150	December 9, 1999	(No short title)	An act to allow the National Park Service to acquire certain land for addition to the Wilderness Battlefield in Virginia, as previously authorized by law, by purchase or exchange as well as by donation	Pub. L. 106–150 (text) (PDF)
106-151	December 9, 1999	(No short title)	An act to amend the Fair Labor Standards Act of 1938 to clarify the overtime exemption for employees engaged in fire protection activities	Pub. L. 106–151 (text) (PDF)
106-152	December 9, 1999	(No short title)	An act to amend title 18, United States Code, to punish the depiction of animal cruelty	Pub. L. 106–152 (text) (PDF)
106-153	December 9, 1999	Father Theodore M. Hesburgh Congressional Gold Medal Act	To authorize the President to award a gold medal on behalf of the Congress to Father Theodore M. Hesburgh, in recognition of his outstanding and enduring contributions to civil rights, higher education, the Catholic Church, the Nation, and the global community	Pub. L. 106–153 (text) (PDF)
106-154	December 9, 1999	(No short title)	An act to improve protection and management of the Chattahoochee River National Recreation Area in the State of Georgia	Pub. L. 106–154 (text) (PDF)
106-155	December 9, 1999	U.S. Holocaust Assets Commission Extension Act	To amend the U.S. Holocaust Assets Commission Act of 1998 to extend the period by which the final report is due and to authorize additional funding; U.S. Holocaust Assets Commission Extension Act of 1999; Holocaust Assets Commission Extension bill	Pub. L. 106–155 (text) (PDF)
106-156	December 9, 1999	Dugger Mountain Wilderness Act of 1999	To designate certain Federal lands in the Talladega National Forest in the State of Alabama as the Dugger Mountain Wilderness	Pub. L. 106–156 (text) (PDF)
106-157	December 9, 1999	(No short title)	An act to authorize the Secretary of the Interior to convey to the State of Illinois certain Federal land associated with the Lewis and Clark National Historic Trail to be used as an historic and interpretive site along the trail	Pub. L. 106–157 (text) (PDF)
106-158	December 9, 1999	Export Enhancement Act of 1999	To reauthorize the Overseas Private Investment Corporation and the Trade and Development Agency, and for other purposes	Pub. L. 106–158 (text) (PDF)
106-159	December 9, 1999	Motor Carrier Safety Improvement Act of 1999	To amend title 49, United States Code, to establish the Federal Motor Carrier Safety Administration, and for other purposes	Pub. L. 106–159 (text) (PDF)
106-160	December 9, 1999	Digital Theft Deterrence and Copyright Damages Improvement Act of 1999	To amend statutory damages provisions of title 17, United States Code; Copyright Damages Improvement bill	Pub. L. 106–160 (text) (PDF)
106-161	December 9, 1999	(No short title)	Conferring status as an honorary veteran of the United States Armed Forces on Zachary Fisher	Pub. L. 106–161 (text) (PDF)
106-162	December 9, 1999	(No short title)	An act to designate the headquarters building of the Department of Housing and Urban Development in Washington, District of Columbia, as the "Robert C. Weaver Federal Building"	Pub. L. 106–162 (text) (PDF)
106-163	December 9, 1999	Chippewa Cree Tribe of the Rocky Boy's Reservation Indian Reserved Water Rights Settlement and Water Supply Enhancement Act of 1999	A bill to provide for the settlement of the water rights claims of the Chippewa Cree Tribe of the Rocky Boy's Reservation, and for other purposes; Chippewa Cree Tribe of the Rocky Boy's Reservation Indian Reserved Water Rights Settlement Act of 1999	Pub. L. 106–163 (text) (PDF)
106-164	December 9, 1999	Fallen Timbers Battlefield and Fort Miamis National Historic Site Act of 1999	A bill to establish the Fallen Timbers Battlefield and Fort Miamis National Historical Site in the State of Ohio; Fallen Timbers Battlefield and Fort Miamis National Historical Site Act	Pub. L. 106–164 (text) (PDF)
106-165	December 9, 1999	Women's Business Centers Sustainability Act of 1999	A bill to amend the Small Business Act with respect to the women's business center program	Pub. L. 106–165 (text) (PDF)
106-166	December 9, 1999	(No short title)	An act to designate the United States courthouse at 401 West Washington Street in Phoenix, Arizona, as the "Sandra Day O'Connor United States Courthouse"	Pub. L. 106–166 (text) (PDF)
106-167	December 9, 1999	John H. Chafee Coastal Barrier Resources System Act	A bill to redesignate the Coastal Barrier Resources System as the "John H. Chafee Coastal Barrier Resources System"	Pub. L. 106–167 (text) (PDF)
106-168	December 12, 1999	Deceptive Mail Prevention and Enforcement Act	A bill to amend Chapter 30 of title 39, United States Code, to provide for the nonmailability of certain deceptive matter relating to sweepstakes, skill contests, facsimile checks, administrative procedures, orders, and civil penalties relating to such matter, and for other purposes; A bill to amend chapter 30 of title 39, United States Code, to provide for the nonmailability of certain deceptive matter relating to games of chance, administrative procedures, orders, and civil penalties relating to such matter, and for other purposes; Federal Reserve Board Retirement Portability Act	Pub. L. 106–168 (text) (PDF)
106-169	December 14, 1999	Foster Care Independence Act of 1999	To amend part E of title IV of the Social Security Act to provide States with more funding and greater flexibility in carrying out programs designed to help children make the transition from foster care to self-sufficiency, and for other purposes	Pub. L. 106–169 (text) (PDF)
106-170	December 17, 1999	Ticket to Work and Work Incentives Improvement Act of 1999	To amend the Social Security Act to expand the availability of health care coverage for working individuals with disabilities, to establish a Ticket to Work and Self-Sufficiency Program in the Social Security Administration to provide such individuals with meaningful opportunities to work, and for other purposes; Tax Relief Extension Act of 1999; Work Incentives Improvement Act of 1999; Tax Extenders bill; Work Incentives Act	Pub. L. 106–170 (text) (PDF)
106-171	February 11, 2000	Electronic Benefit Transfer Interoperability and Portability Act of 2000	A bill to amend the Food Stamp Act of 1977 to provide for a national standard of interoperability and portability applicable to electronic food stamp benefit transactions; Electronic Benefit Transfer Interoperability and Portability Act of 1999	Pub. L. 106–171 (text) (PDF)
106-172	February 18, 2000	Hillory J. Farias and Samantha Reid Date-Rape Drug Prohibition Act of 2000	An act to amend the Controlled Substances Act to direct the emergency scheduling of gamma hydroxybutyric acid, to provide for a national awareness campaign, and for other purposes; To amend the Controlled Substances Act to add gamma hydroxybutyric acid and ketamine to the schedules of control substances, to provide for a national awareness campaign, and for other purposes; Hillory J. Farias Date-Rape Prevention Drug Act of 1999; Hillory J. Farias and Samantha Reid Date-Rape Drug Prohibition Act of 1999; Date-Rape Prevention Drug bill	Pub. L. 106–172 (text) (PDF)
106-173	February 25, 2000	Abraham Lincoln Bicentennial Commission Act	To establish the Abraham Lincoln Bicentennial Commission	Pub. L. 106–173 (text) (PDF)
106-174	February 25, 2000	Poison Control Center Enhancement and Awareness Act	A bill to provide assistance for poison prevention and to stabilize the funding of regional poison control centers	Pub. L. 106–174 (text) (PDF)
106-175	March 5, 2000	(No short title)	An act to authorize the President to award a gold medal on behalf of the Congress to John Cardinal O'Connor, Archbishop of New York, in recognition of his accomplishments as a priest, a chaplain, and a humanitarian	Pub. L. 106–175 (text) (PDF)
106-176	March 10, 2000	Omnibus Parks Technical Corrections Act of 2000	To make technical corrections to the Omnibus Parks and Public Lands Management Act of 1996; Omnibus Parks Technical Corrections Act of 1999	Pub. L. 106–176 (text) (PDF)
106-177	March 10, 2000	Child Abuse Prevention and Enforcement Act	To reduce the incidence of child abuse and neglect, and for other purposes; Jennifer's Law	Pub. L. 106–177 (text) (PDF)
106-178	March 14, 2000	Iran Nonproliferation Act of 2000	To provide for the application of measures to foreign persons who transfer to Iran certain goods, services, or technology, and for other purposes; Iran Nonproliferation Act of 1999; Iran Nonproliferation bill	Pub. L. 106–178 (text) (PDF)
106-179	March 14, 2000	Indian Tribal Economic Development and Contract Encouragement Act of 2000	A bill to encourage Indian economic development, to provide for the disclosure of Indian tribal sovereign immunity in contracts involving Indian tribes, and for other purposes; Indian Tribal Economic Development and Contract Encouragement Act of 1999	Pub. L. 106–179 (text) (PDF)
106-180	March 17, 2000	Open-market Reorganization for the Betterment of International Telecommunications Act	A bill to amend the Communications Satellite Act of 1962 to promote competition and privatization in satellite communications, and for other purposes; Communications Satellite Competition and Privatization Act of 1999; ORBIT Act; ORBIT bill	Pub. L. 106–180 (text) (PDF)
106-181	April 5, 2000	Wendell H. Ford Aviation Investment and Reform Act for the 21st Century	To amend title 49, United States Code, to reauthorize programs of the Federal Aviation Administration, and for other purposes; Aircraft Safety Act of 2000; Aviation Investment and Reform Act for the 21st Century; National Parks Air Tour Management Act of 1999; National Parks Air Tour Management Act of 2000; Truth in Budgeting Act; AIR-21 bill; FAA Reauthorization bill; Federal Aviation Administration Authorization bill	Pub. L. 106–181 (text) (PDF)
106-182	April 7, 2000	Senior Citizens' Freedom to Work Act of 2000	To amend title II of the Social Security Act to eliminate the earnings test for individuals who have attained retirement age; Senior Citizens' Freedom to Work Act of 1999; Social Security Earnings Test Elimination bill	Pub. L. 106–182 (text) (PDF)
106-183	April 13, 2000	(No short title)	An act to designate the United States Post Office building located at 680 U.S. Highway 130 in Hamilton, New Jersey, as the "John K. Rafferty Hamilton Post Office Building"	Pub. L. 106–183 (text) (PDF)
106-184	April 14, 2000	(No short title)	An act to designate the United States post office located at 14071 Peyton Drive in Chino Hills, California, as the "Joseph Ileto Post Office"	Pub. L. 106–184 (text) (PDF)
106-185	April 25, 2000	Civil Asset Forfeiture Reform Act of 2000	To provide a more just and uniform procedure for Federal civil forfeitures, and for other purposes; Civil Asset Forfeiture Reform Act; Civil Asset Forfeiture bill	Pub. L. 106–185 (text) (PDF)
106-186	April 25, 2000	(No short title)	Joint resolution expressing the sense of Congress that the President of the United States should encourage free and fair elections and respect for democracy in Peru	Pub. L. 106–186 (text) (PDF)
106-187	April 28, 2000	(No short title)	An act to direct the Secretary of Agriculture to convey certain National Forest lands to Elko County, Nevada, for continued use as a cemetery	Pub. L. 106–187 (text) (PDF)
106-188	April 28, 2000	Bikini Resettlement and Relocation Act of 2000	To assist in the resettlement and relocation of the people of Bikini Atoll by amending the terms of the trust fund established during the United States administration of the Trust Territory of the Pacific Islands; Bikini Resettlement and Relocation Act of 1999; Bikini Resettlement and Relocation Act of 1999	Pub. L. 106–188 (text) (PDF)
106-189	April 28, 2000	(No short title)	An act to direct the Secretary of the Interior to release reversionary interests held by the United States in certain parcels of land in Washington County, Utah, to facilitate an anticipated land exchange	Pub. L. 106–189 (text) (PDF)
106-190	April 28, 2000	(No short title)	An act to clarify the legal effect on the United States of the acquisition of a parcel of land in the Red Cliffs Desert Reserve in the State of Utah	Pub. L. 106–190 (text) (PDF)
106-191	April 28, 2000	(No short title)	An act to amend the Mineral Leasing Act to increase the maximum acreage of Federal leases for sodium that may be held by an entity in any one State, and for other purposes	Pub. L. 106–191 (text) (PDF)
106-192	May 2, 2000	Lamprey Wild and Scenic River Extension Act	To amend the Wild and Scenic Rivers Act to extend the designation of a portion of the Lamprey River in New Hampshire as a recreational river to include an additional river segment	Pub. L. 106–192 (text) (PDF)
106-193	May 2, 2000	Methane Hydrate Research and Development Act of 2000	An act to provide the research, identification, assessment, exploration, and development of methane hydrate resources, and for other purposes; To promote the research, identification, assessment, exploration, and development of methane hydrate resources, and for other purposes; Gas Hydrate Research and Development Act of 1999; Methane Hydrate Research and Development Act of 1999	Pub. L. 106–193 (text) (PDF)
106-194	May 2, 2000	(No short title)	An act to amend the Alaska Native Claims Settlement Act to restore certain lands to the Elim Native Corporation, and for other purposes	Pub. L. 106–194 (text) (PDF)
106-195	May 2, 2000	(No short title)	Recognizing the 50th anniversary of the Korean War and the service by members of the Armed Forces during such war, and for other purposes	Pub. L. 106–195 (text) (PDF)
106-196	May 2, 2000	(No short title)	An act to designate the United States courthouse located at 223 Broad Avenue in Albany, Georgia, as the 'C.B. King United States Courthouse'	Pub. L. 106–196 (text) (PDF)
106-197	May 2, 2000	Continued Reporting of Intercepted Wire, Oral, and Electronic Communications Act	A bill to continue reporting requirements of section 2519 of title 18, United States Code, beyond December 21, 1999, and for other purposes	Pub. L. 106–197 (text) (PDF)
106-198	May 5, 2000	(No short title)	Joint resolution providing for the appointment of Alan G. Spoon as a citizen regent of the Board of Regents of the Smithsonian Institution	Pub. L. 106–198 (text) (PDF)
106-199	May 5, 2000	(No short title)	Joint resolution providing for the reappointment of Manuel L. Ibanez as a citizen regent of the Board of Regents of the Smithsonian Institution	Pub. L. 106–199 (text) (PDF)
106-200	May 18, 2000	Trade and Development Act of 2000	An act to authorize a new trade and investment policy for sub-Sahara Africa, expand trade benefits to the countries in the Caribbean Basin, renew the generalized system of preferences, and reauthorize the trade adjustment assistance programs; African Growth and Opportunity Act; Trade Adjustment Assistance for Farmers Act; Trade and Development Act of 1999; United States-Caribbean Basin Trade Enhancement Act; United States-Caribbean Basin Trade Partnership Act; Africa Free Trade bill; Sub-Saharan Africa Free Trade bill; United States-Caribbean Basin Trade Partnership Act	Pub. L. 106–200 (text) (PDF)
106-201	May 18, 2000	(No short title)	An original bill to amend the Endangered Species Act of 1973 to provide that certain species conservation reports shall continue to be submitted	Pub. L. 106–201 (text) (PDF)
106-202	May 18, 2000	Worker Economic Opportunity Act	A bill to amend the Fair Labor Standards Act of 1938 to clarify the treatment of stock options under the Act	Pub. L. 106–202 (text) (PDF)
106-203	May 22, 2000	(No short title)	An act to designate the Federal building and United States courthouse located at 1300 South Harrison Street in Fort Wayne, Indiana, as the "E. Ross Adair Federal Building and United States Courthouse"	Pub. L. 106–203 (text) (PDF)
106-204	May 23, 2000	(No short title)	An act to designate the Federal building located at 500 Pearl Street in New York City, New York, as the "Daniel Patrick Moynihan United States Courthouse"	Pub. L. 106–204 (text) (PDF)
106-205	May 26, 2000	(No short title)	Joint resolution supporting the Day of Honor 2000 to honor and recognize the service of minority veterans in the United States Armed Forces during World War II	Pub. L. 106–205 (text) (PDF)
106-206	May 26, 2000	(No short title)	An act to allow the Secretary of the Interior and the Secretary of Agriculture to establish a fee system for commercial filming activities on Federal land, and for other purposes	Pub. L. 106–206 (text) (PDF)
106-207	May 26, 2000	Hmong Veterans' Naturalization Act of 2000	To expedite the naturalization of aliens who served with special guerrilla units in Laos; Hmong Veterans' Naturalization Act of 1999	Pub. L. 106–207 (text) (PDF)
106-208	May 26, 2000	National Historic Preservation Act Amendments of 2000	A bill to extend the authorization for the Historic Preservation Fund and the Advisory Council on Historic Preservation, and for other purposes; To extend the authorization for the National Historic Preservation Fund, and for other purposes; National Historic Preservation Act Amendments of 1999	Pub. L. 106–208 (text) (PDF)
106-209	May 26, 2000	(No short title)	An act to designate the facility of the United States Postal Service located at 9308 South Chicago Avenue, Chicago, Illinois, as the "John J. Buchanan Post Office Building"	Pub. L. 106–209 (text) (PDF)
106-210	May 26, 2000	Muhammad Ali Boxing Reform Act	To reform unfair and anticompetitive practices in the professional boxing industry	Pub. L. 106–210 (text) (PDF)
106-211	May 26, 2000	(No short title)	An act to amend the Higher Education Act of 1965 to improve the program for American Indian Tribal Colleges and Universities under part A of title III	Pub. L. 106–211 (text) (PDF)
106-212	May 26, 2000	American Institute in Taiwan Facilities Enhancement Act	To authorize funds for the site selection and construction of a facility in Taipei Taiwan suitable for the mission of the American Institute in Taiwan	Pub. L. 106–212 (text) (PDF)
106-213	May 26, 2000	(No short title)	An act to extend the deadline for commencement of construction of a hydroelectric project in the State of Alabama	Pub. L. 106–213 (text) (PDF)
106-214	June 15, 2000	(No short title)	An act to amend the law that authorized the Vietnam Veterans Memorial to authorize the placement within the site of the memorial of a plaque to honor those Vietnam veterans who died after their service in the Vietnam war, but as a direct result of that service	Pub. L. 106–214 (text) (PDF)
106-215	June 15, 2000	Immigration and Naturalization Service Data Management Improvement Act of 2000	To amend section 110 of the Illegal Immigration Reform and Immigrant Responsibility Act of 1996, and for other purposes	Pub. L. 106–215 (text) (PDF)
106-216	June 21, 2000	(No short title)	An act to authorize leases for terms not to exceed 99 years on land held in trust for the Torres Martinez Desert Cahuilla Indians and the Guidiville Band of Pomo Indians of the Guidiville Indian Rancheria	Pub. L. 106–216 (text) (PDF)
106-217	June 21, 2000	(No short title)	An act to provide that land which is owned by the Lower Sioux Indian Community in the State of Minnesota but which is not held in trust by the United States for the Community may be leased or transferred by the Community without further approval by the United States	Pub. L. 106–217 (text) (PDF)
106-218	June 21, 2000	(No short title)	An act to designate the Federal building located at 2201 C Street, Northwest, in the District of Columbia, currently headquarters for the Department of State, as the "Harry S. Truman Federal Building"	Pub. L. 106–218 (text) (PDF)
106-219	June 21, 2000	(No short title)	An act to designate the Washington Opera in Washington, D.C., as the National Opera	Pub. L. 106–219 (text) (PDF)
106-220	June 21, 2000	Carlsbad Irrigation Project Acquired Land Transfer Act	A bill to convey certain real property within the Carlsbad Project in New Mexico to the Carlsbad Irrigation District	Pub. L. 106–220 (text) (PDF)
106-221	June 21, 2000	Wellton-Mohawk Transfer Act	A bill to authorize the Secretary of the Interior to convey certain works, facilities, and titles of the Gila Project, and designated lands within or adjacent to the Gila Project, to the Wellton-Mohawk Irrigation and Drainage District, and for other purposes	Pub. L. 106–221 (text) (PDF)
106-222	June 21, 2000	Freedom to E-File Act	A bill to require the Department of Agriculture to establish an electronic filing and retrieval system to enable the public to file all required paperwork electronically with the Department and to have access to public information on farm programs, quarterly trade, economic, and production reports, and other similar information; An Act to require the Secretary of Agriculture to establish an electronic filing and retrieval system; An act to require the Secretary of Agriculture to establish an electronic filing and retrieval system to enable farmers and other persons to file paperwork electronically with selected agencies of the Department of Agriculture and to access public information regarding the programs administered by these agencies; to enable farmers and other persons to file paperwork electronically with selected agencies of the Department of Agriculture and to access public information regarding the programs administered by these agencies	Pub. L. 106–222 (text) (PDF)
106-223	June 21, 2000	(No short title)	An act to authorize the award of the Medal of Honor to Ed W. Freeman, James K. Okubo, and Andrew J. Smith	Pub. L. 106–223 (text) (PDF)
106-224	June 22, 2000	Agricultural Risk Protection Act of 2000	To amend the Federal Crop Insurance Act to strengthen the safety net for agricultural producers by providing greater access to more affordable risk management tools and improved protection from production and income loss, to improve the efficiency and integrity of the Federal crop insurance program, and for other purposes; Agricultural Risk Protection Act of 1999; Biomass Research and Development Act of 2000; Plant Protection Act; Risk Management for the 21st Century Act; Crop Insurance bill; Risk Management for the 21st Century Act	Pub. L. 106–224 (text) (PDF)
106-225	June 22, 2000	(No short title)	An act to authorize the President to award posthumously a gold medal on behalf of the Congress to Charles M. Schulz in recognition of his lasting artistic contributions to the Nation and the world, and for other purposes	Pub. L. 106–225 (text) (PDF)
106-226	June 27, 2000	(No short title)	An act to provide that the School Governance Charter Amendment Act of 2000 shall take effect upon the date such Act is ratified by the voters of the District of Columbia	Pub. L. 106–226 (text) (PDF)
106-227	June 29, 2000	(No short title)	Recognizing the 225th birthday of the United States Army	Pub. L. 106–227 (text) (PDF)
106-228	June 29, 2000	(No short title)	An act to make technical corrections to the status of certain land held in trust for the Mississippi Band of Choctaw Indians, to take certain land into trust for that Band, and for other purposes	Pub. L. 106–228 (text) (PDF)
106-229	June 30, 2000	Electronic Signatures in Global and National Commerce Act	A bill to regulate interstate commerce by electronic means by permitting and encouraging the continued expansion of electronic commerce through the operation of free market forces, and for other purposes; Electronic Signatures in Global and National Commerce Act; Millennium Digital Commerce Act; Third Millennium Digital Commerce Act; Digital Signatures bill; E-SIGN bill; Electronic Signatures bill	Pub. L. 106–229 (text) (PDF)
106-230	July 1, 2000	Third Millennium Digital Commerce Act	An act to amend the Internal Revenue Code of 1986 to require 527 organizations to disclose their political activities	Pub. L. 106–230 (text) (PDF)
106-231	July 6, 2000	(No short title)	An act to redesignate the Federal building located at 701 South Santa Fe Avenue in Compton, California, and known as the Compton Main Post Office, as the "Mervyn Malcolm Dymally Post Office Building"	Pub. L. 106–231 (text) (PDF)
106-232	July 6, 2000	(No short title)	An act to redesignate the Federal building located at 10301 South Compton Avenue, in Los Angeles, California, and known as the Watts Finance Office, as the "Augustus F. Hawkins Post Office Building"	Pub. L. 106–232 (text) (PDF)
106-233	July 6, 2000	(No short title)	An act to designate the facility of the United States Postal Service at 200 East Pinckney Street in Madison, Florida, as the "Captain Colin P. Kelly, Jr. Post Office"	Pub. L. 106–233 (text) (PDF)
106-234	July 6, 2000	(No short title)	An act to designate the building of the United States Postal Service located at 5 Cedar Street in Hopkinton, Massachusetts, as the "Thomas J. Brown Post Office Building"	Pub. L. 106–234 (text) (PDF)
106-235	July 6, 2000	(No short title)	An act to designate the United States Post Office located at 3675 Warrensville Center Road in Shaker Heights, Ohio, as the "Louise Stokes Post Office"	Pub. L. 106–235 (text) (PDF)
106-236	July 6, 2000	(No short title)	An act to designate the United States Post Office located at 125 Border Avenue West in Wiggins, Mississippi, as the "Jay Hanna 'Dizzy' Dean Post Office"	Pub. L. 106–236 (text) (PDF)
106-237	July 6, 2000	(No short title)	An act to designate the United States Post Office located at 713 Elm Street in Wakefield, Kansas, as the "William H. Avery Post Office"	Pub. L. 106–237 (text) (PDF)
106-238	July 6, 2000	(No short title)	An act to redesignate the facility of the United States Postal Service located at 100 Orchard Park Drive in Greenville, South Carolina, as the "Keith D. Oglesby Station"	Pub. L. 106–238 (text) (PDF)
106-239	July 6, 2000	(No short title)	An act to designate certain facilities of the United States Postal Service in South Carolina	Pub. L. 106–239 (text) (PDF)
106-240	July 6, 2000	(No short title)	An act to designate the facility of the United States Postal Service located at 8409 Lee Highway in Merrifield, Virginia, as the "Joel T. Broyhill Postal Building"	Pub. L. 106–240 (text) (PDF)
106-241	July 6, 2000	(No short title)	An act to designate the facility of the United States Postal Service located at 3118 Washington Boulevard in Arlington, Virginia, as the "Joseph L. Fisher Post Office Building"	Pub. L. 106–241 (text) (PDF)
106-242	July 6, 2000	(No short title)	An act to designate the facility of the United States Postal Service located at 1818 Milton Avenue in Janesville, Wisconsin, as the "Les Aspin Post Office Building"	Pub. L. 106–242 (text) (PDF)
106-243	July 10, 2000	(No short title)	An act to direct the Secretary of the Interior, the Bureau of Reclamation, to conduct a feasibility study on the Jicarilla Apache Reservation in the State of New Mexico, and for other purposes	Pub. L. 106–243 (text) (PDF)
106-244	July 10, 2000	Church Plan Parity and Entanglement Prevention Act of 1999	A bill to amend title I of the Employee Retirement Income Security Act of 1974 to provide for the preemption of State law in certain cases relating to certain church plans	Pub. L. 106–244 (text) (PDF)
106-245	July 10, 2000	Radiation Exposure Compensation Act Amendments of 2000	A bill to amend the Radiation Exposure Compensation Act, and for other purposes; Radiation Exposure Compensation Act Amendments of 1999	Pub. L. 106–245 (text) (PDF)
106-246	July 13, 2000	Military Construction Appropriations Act, 2001	Making appropriations for military construction, family housing, and base realignment and closure for the Department of Defense for the fiscal year ending September 30, 2001, and for other purposes; Cerro Grande Fire Assistance Act; Cerro Grande Fire Supplemental; Emergency Supplemental Act, 2000; Lewis and Clark Rural Water System Act of 2000; Appropriations bill FY2001, Military Construction; Military Construction FY2001 Appropriations bill	Pub. L. 106–246 (text) (PDF)
106-247	July 20, 2000	Neotropical Migratory Bird Conservation Act	A bill to require the Secretary of the Interior to establish a program to provide assistance in the conservation of neotropical migratory birds	Pub. L. 106–247 (text) (PDF)
106-248	July 25, 2000	Valles Caldera Preservation Act	An act to authorize the acquisition of the Valles Caldera, to provide for an effective land and wildlife management program for this resource within the Department of Agriculture, and for other purposes	Pub. L. 106–248 (text) (PDF)
106-249	July 26, 2000	Griffith Project Prepayment and Conveyance Act	A bill to direct the Secretary of the Interior to convey the Griffith Project to the Southern Nevada Water Authority	Pub. L. 106–249 (text) (PDF)
106-250	July 27, 2000	Pope John Paul II Congressional Gold Medal Act	To authorize a gold medal to be awarded on behalf of the Congress to Pope John Paul II in recognition of his many and enduring contributions to peace and religious understanding, and for other purposes; To authorize a gold medal to be presented on behalf of the Congress to Pope John Paul II in recognition of his many and enduring contributions to peace and religious understanding, and for other purposes	Pub. L. 106–250 (text) (PDF)
106-251	July 27, 2000	(No short title)	An act to provide for the award of a gold medal on behalf of the Congress to former President Ronald Reagan and his wife Nancy Reagan in recognition of their service to the Nation	Pub. L. 106–251 (text) (PDF)
106-252	July 28, 2000	Mobile Telecommunications Sourcing Act	To amend title 4 of the United States Code to establish nexus requirements for State and local taxation of mobile telecommunication services; To amend title 4 of the United States Code to establish sourcing requirements for State and local taxation of mobile telecommunication services	Pub. L. 106–252 (text) (PDF)
106-253	July 28, 2000	Semipostal Authorization Act	To grant to the United States Postal Service the authority to issue semipostals, and for other purposes	Pub. L. 106–253 (text) (PDF)
106-254	August 2, 2000	Federal Law Enforcement Animal Protection Act of 2000	To amend title 18, United States Code, to provide penalties for harming animals used in Federal law enforcement; Federal Law Enforcement Animal Protection Act of 1999	Pub. L. 106–254 (text) (PDF)
106-255	August 2, 2000	Cross-Border Cooperation and Environmental Safety in Northern Europe Act of 2000	To foster cross-border cooperation and environmental cleanup in Northern Europe	Pub. L. 106–255 (text) (PDF)
106-256	August 7, 2000	Oceans Act of 2000	A bill to establish a Commission on Ocean Policy, and for other purposes	Pub. L. 106–256 (text) (PDF)
106-257	August 8, 2000	Oregon Land Exchange Act of 2000	A bill to provide for the exchange of certain land in the State of Oregon; Northeast Oregon Assembled Land Exchange Act of 1999; Oregon Land Exchange Act of 1999; Triangle Land Exchange Act of 1999	Pub. L. 106–257 (text) (PDF)
106-258	August 8, 2000	Triangle Land Exchange Act of 1999	An act to amend the Act establishing Women's Rights National Historical Park to permit the Secretary of the Interior to acquire title in fee simple to the Hunt House located in Waterloo, New York	Pub. L. 106–258 (text) (PDF)
106-259	August 9, 2000	Department of Defense Appropriations Act, 2001	Making appropriations for the Department of Defense for the fiscal year ending September 30, 2001, and for other purposes; FY2001 Defense Appropriations bill	Pub. L. 106–259 (text) (PDF)
106-260	August 18, 2000	Tribal Self-Governance Amendments of 2000	To amend the Indian Self-Determination and Education Assistance Act to provide for further self-governance by Indian tribes, and for other purposes; Tribal Self-Governance Amendments of 1999; Tribal Self-Governance Amendments of 1999	Pub. L. 106–260 (text) (PDF)
106-261	August 18, 2000	(No short title)	An act to designate Wilson Creek in Avery and Caldwell Counties, North Carolina, as a component of the National Wild and Scenic Rivers System	Pub. L. 106–261 (text) (PDF)
106-262	August 18, 2000	(No short title)	An act to name the Department of Veterans Affairs outpatient clinic located at 125 Brookley Drive, Rome, New York, as the "Donald J. Mitchell Department of Veterans Affairs Outpatient Clinic"	Pub. L. 106–262 (text) (PDF)
106-263	August 18, 2000	Shivwits Band of the Paiute Indian Tribe of Utah Water Rights Settlement Act	To provide for the settlement of the water rights claims of the Shivwits Band of the Paiute Indian Tribe of Utah, and for other purposes	Pub. L. 106–263 (text) (PDF)
106-264	August 19, 2000	Global AIDS and Tuberculosis Relief Act of 2000	To provide for negotiations for the creation of a trust fund to be administered by the International Bank for Reconstruction and Development of the International Development Association to combat the AIDS epidemic; Global AIDS Research and Relief Act of 2000; International Tuberculosis Control Act of 2000; World Bank AIDS Marshall Plan Trust Fund Act; World Bank AIDS Prevention Trust Fund Act	Pub. L. 106–264 (text) (PDF)
106-265	September 19, 2000	Long-Term Care Security Act	A bill to amend title 5, United States Code, to provide for the establishment of a program under which long-term care insurance is made available to Federal employees, members of the uniformed services, and civilian and military retirees, provide for the correction of retirement coverage errors under chapters 83 and 84 of such title, and for other purposes; To amend title 5, United States Code, to provide for the establishment of a program under which long-term care insurance is made available to Federal employees, members of the uniformed services, and civilian and military retirees, and for other purposes; Federal Erroneous Retirement Coverage Corrections Act; Federal Erroneous Retirement Coverage Corrections Act	Pub. L. 106–265 (text) (PDF)
106-266	September 22, 2000	(No short title)	An act to designate the Federal facility located at 1301 Emmet Street in Charlottesville, Virginia, as the "Pamela B. Gwin Hall"	Pub. L. 106–266 (text) (PDF)
106-267	September 22, 2000	(No short title)	An act to designate the United States border station located in Pharr, Texas, as the "Kika de la Garza United States Border Station"	Pub. L. 106–267 (text) (PDF)
106-268	September 22, 2000	(No short title)	An act to designate the Federal building located at 743 East Durango Boulevard in San Antonio, Texas, as the "Adrian A. Spears Judicial Training Center"	Pub. L. 106–268 (text) (PDF)
106-269	September 22, 2000	(No short title)	An act to designate the United States courthouse located at 220 West Depot Street in Greeneville, Tennessee, as the "James H. Quillen United States Courthouse"	Pub. L. 106–269 (text) (PDF)
106-270	September 22, 2000	Deschutes Resources Conservancy Reauthorization Act of 2000	A bill to reauthorize the participation of the Bureau of Reclamation in the Deschutes Resources Conservancy, and for other purposes; Deschutes Resources Conservancy Reauthorization Act of 1999	Pub. L. 106–270 (text) (PDF)
106-271	September 22, 2000	Corinth Battlefield Preservation Act of 2000	A bill to establish the Corinth Unit of Shiloh National Military Park, in the vicinity of the city of Corinth, Mississippi, and in the State of Tennessee, and for other purposes; Corinth Battlefield Preservation Act of 1999	Pub. L. 106–271 (text) (PDF)
106-272	September 22, 2000	Jackson Multi-Agency Campus Act of 1999	A bill to authorize the development and maintenance of a multiagency campus project in the town of Jackson, Wyoming	Pub. L. 106–272 (text) (PDF)
106-273	September 22, 2000	(No short title)	An act to amend the Pacific Northwest Electric Power Planning and Conservation Act to provide for sales of electricity by the Bonneville Power Administration to joint operating entities	Pub. L. 106–273 (text) (PDF)
106-274	September 22, 2000	Religious Land Use and Institutionalized Persons Act of 2000	A bill to protect religious liberty, and for other purposes	Pub. L. 106–274 (text) (PDF)
106-275	September 29, 2000	Making continuing appropriations for the fiscal year 2001, and for other purposes	Continuing Appropriation FY2001 (First)	Pub. L. 106–275 (text) (PDF)
106-276	October 2, 2000	(No short title)	An act to amend the Omnibus Crime Control and Safe Streets Act of 1968 to extend the retroactive eligibility dates for financial assistance for higher education for spouses and dependent children of Federal, State, and local law enforcement officers who are killed in the line of duty	Pub. L. 106–276 (text) (PDF)
106-277	October 2, 2000	(No short title)	An act to authorize the payment of rewards to individuals furnishing information relating to persons subject to indictment for serious violations of international humanitarian law in Rwanda, and for other purposes	Pub. L. 106–277 (text) (PDF)
106-278	October 6, 2000	Lackawanna Valley National Heritage Area Act of 1999	An act to designate the Lackawanna Valley and the Schuylkill River National Heritage Areas, and for other purposes; To establish the Lackawanna Heritage Valley American Heritage Area; Lackawanna Valley National Heritage Area Act of 2000; Schuylkill River Valley National Heritage Act; Schuylkill River Valley National Heritage Area Act	Pub. L. 106–278 (text) (PDF)
106-279	October 6, 2000	Intercountry Adoption Act of 2000	To provide for implementation by the United States of the Hague Convention on Protection of Children and Cooperation in Respect of Intercountry Adoption, and for other purposes; Intercountry Adoption Act of 1999; Intercountry Adoption Convention Implementation bill	Pub. L. 106–279 (text) (PDF)
106-280	October 6, 2000	Security Assistance Act of 2000	To amend the Foreign Assistance Act of 1961 and the Arms Export Control Act to make improvements to certain defense and security assistance provisions under those Acts, to authorize the transfer of naval vessels to certain foreign countries, and for other purposes; Defense and Security Assistance Act of 2000	Pub. L. 106–280 (text) (PDF)
106-281	October 6, 2000	FHA Downpayment Simplification Extension Act of 2000	To amend the National Housing Act to temporarily extend the applicability of the downpayment simplification provisions for the FHA single family housing mortgage insurance program	Pub. L. 106–281 (text) (PDF)
106-282	October 6, 2000	Making further continuing appropriations for the fiscal year 2001, and for other purposes	Continuing Appropriation FY2001 (Second)	Pub. L. 106–282 (text) (PDF)
106-283	October 6, 2000	Kake Tribal Corporation Land Transfer Act	A bill to amend the Alaska Native Claims Settlement Act, to provide for a land exchange between the Secretary of Agriculture and the Kake Tribal Corporation, and for other purposes; Kake Tribal Corporation Land Transfer Act; Kake Tribal Corporation Land Exchange Act; Kake Tribal Corporation Public Interest Land Exchange Act	Pub. L. 106–283 (text) (PDF)
106-284	October 10, 2000	Beaches Environmental Assessment and Coastal Health Act of 2000	To amend the Federal Water Pollution Control Act to improve the quality of coastal recreation waters, and for other purposes; Beaches Environmental Assessment, Cleanup, and Health Act of 1999; Beaches Environmental Awareness, Cleanup, and Health Act of 1999; Beach Clean-up bill	Pub. L. 106–284 (text) (PDF)
106-285	October 10, 2000	Ak-Chin Water Use Amendments Act of 1999	To amend the Act entitled "An Act relating to the water rights of the Ak-Chin Indian Community" to clarify certain provisions concerning the leasing of such water rights, and for other purposes	Pub. L. 106–285 (text) (PDF)
106-286	October 10, 2000	U.S.-China Relations Act of 2000	An act to authorize extension of nondiscriminatory treatment (normal trade relations treatment) to the People's Republic of China, and to establish a framework for relations between the United States and the People's Republic of China	Pub. L. 106–286 (text) (PDF)
106-287	October 10, 2000	(No short title)	An act to grant the consent of the Congress to the Kansas and Missouri Metropolitan Culture District Compact	Pub. L. 106–287 (text) (PDF)
106-288	October 10, 2000	(No short title)	Granting the consent of the Congress to the Red River Boundary Compact	Pub. L. 106–288 (text) (PDF)
106-289	October 10, 2000	(No short title)	An act to designate the United States Post Office located at 3813 Main Street in East Chicago, Indiana, as the "Lance Corporal Harold Gomez Post Office"	Pub. L. 106–289 (text) (PDF)
106-290	October 10, 2000	(No short title)	An act to expand the boundaries of the Gettysburg National Military Park to include Wills House, and for other purposes	Pub. L. 106–290 (text) (PDF)
106-291	October 11, 2000	Department of the Interior and Related Agencies Appropriations Act, 2001	Making appropriations for the Department of the Interior and related agencies for the fiscal year ending September 30, 2001, and for other purposes; Boise Laboratory Replacement Act of 2000; Cabin User Fee Fairness Act of 2000; First Ladies National Historic Site Act of 2000; National Underground Railroad Freedom Center Act; Palace of the Governors Annex Act; Wheeling National Heritage Area Act of 2000; Appropriations bill FY2001, Interior; Interior Department FY2001 Appropriations bill; Wheeling National Heritage Area Act of 2000	Pub. L. 106–291 (text) (PDF)
106-292	October 12, 2000	(No short title)	An act to authorize appropriations for the United States Holocaust Memorial Museum, and for other purposes	Pub. L. 106–292 (text) (PDF)
106-293	October 12, 2000	Presidential Transition Act of 2000	To provide for the training or orientation of individuals, during a Presidential transition, who the President intends to appoint to certain key positions, to provide for a study and report on improving the financial disclosure process for certain Presidential nominees, and for other purposes	Pub. L. 106–293 (text) (PDF)
106-294	October 12, 2000	Federal Prisoner Health Care Copayment Act of 2000	A bill to amend title 18, United States Code, to combat the overutilization of prison health care services and control rising prisoner health care costs; Federal Prisoner Health Care Copayment Act of 1999	Pub. L. 106–294 (text) (PDF)
106-295	October 13, 2000	Federal Prisoner Health Care Copayment Act of 1999	An act to designate the bridge on United States Route 231 that crosses the Ohio River between Maceo, Kentucky, and Rockport, Indiana, as the "William H. Natcher Bridge"	Pub. L. 106–295 (text) (PDF)
106-296	October 13, 2000	(No short title)	An act to designate the Federal building and United States courthouse located at 402 North Walnut Street in Harrison, Arkansas, as the `J. Smith Henley Federal Building and United States Courthouse'	Pub. L. 106–296 (text) (PDF)
106-297	October 13, 2000	Death in Custody Reporting Act of 2000	To amend the Violent Crime Control and Law Enforcement Act of 1994 to ensure that certain information regarding prisoners is reported to the Attorney General	Pub. L. 106–297 (text) (PDF)
106-298	October 13, 2000	Lincoln County Land Act of 2000	To give Lincoln County, Nevada, the right to purchase at fair market value certain public land located within that county, and for other purposes; Lincoln County Land Act of 1999	Pub. L. 106–298 (text) (PDF)
106-299	October 13, 2000	Wekiva Wild and Scenic River Act of 2000	To amend the Wild and Scenic Rivers Act to designate the Wekiva River and its tributaries of Rock Springs Run and Black Water Creek in the State of Florida as components of the national wild and scenic rivers system; Wekiva Wild and Scenic River Act of 1999	Pub. L. 106–299 (text) (PDF)
106-300	October 13, 2000	Red River National Wildlife Refuge Act	To establish the Red River National Wildlife Refuge	Pub. L. 106–300 (text) (PDF)
106-301	October 13, 2000	Utah West Desert Land Exchange Act of 2000	To provide for the exchange of certain lands within the State of Utah; Wekiva Wild and Scenic River Act of 1999	Pub. L. 106–301 (text) (PDF)
106-302	October 13, 2000	(No short title)	An act to extend the authorization for the Air Force Memorial Foundation to establish a memorial in the District of Columbia or its environs	Pub. L. 106–302 (text) (PDF)
106-303	October 13, 2000	(No short title)	An act to make certain personnel flexibilities available with respect to the General Accounting Office, and for other purposes	Pub. L. 106–303 (text) (PDF)
106-304	October 13, 2000	(No short title)	An act to designate the Federal building located at 1710 Alabama Avenue in Jasper, Alabama, as the "Carl Elliott Federal Building"	Pub. L. 106–304 (text) (PDF)
106-305	October 13, 2000	(No short title)	An act to designate the United States customhouse located at 101 East Main Street in Norfolk, Virginia, as the "Owen B. Pickett United States Customhouse"	Pub. L. 106–305 (text) (PDF)
106-306	October 13, 2000	Making further continuing appropriations for the fiscal year 2001, and for other purposes	Continuing Appropriation FY2001 (Third)	Pub. L. 106–306 (text) (PDF)
106-307	October 13, 2000	El Camino Real de Tierra Adentro National Historic Trail Act	A bill to amend the National Trails System Act to designate El Camino Real de Tierra Adentro as a National Historic Trail	Pub. L. 106–307 (text) (PDF)
106-308	October 13, 2000	(No short title)	An act to designate the Federal courthouse at 145 East Simpson Avenue in Jackson, Wyoming, as the "Clifford P. Hansen Federal Courthouse"	Pub. L. 106–308 (text) (PDF)
106-309	October 17, 2000	Microenterprise for Self-Reliance and International Anti-Corruption Act of 2000	To establish a program to provide assistance for programs of credit and other financial services for microenterprises in developing countries, and for other purposes; International Academic Opportunity Act of 2000; International Anti-Corruption and Good Governance Act of 2000; Microenterprise for Self-Reliance Act of 1999; Microenterprise for Self-Reliance Act of 2000; Paul D. Coverdell Fellows Program Act of 2000; Support for Overseas Cooperative Development Act	Pub. L. 106–309 (text) (PDF)
106-310	October 17, 2000	Children's Health Act of 2000	To amend the Public Health Service Act with respect to children's health; Advancement in Pediatric Autism Research Act of 2000; Autism Statistics, Surveillance, Research, and Epidemiology Act of 2000 (ASSURE); Children's Asthma Relief Act of 2000; Drug Addiction Treatment Act of 2000; Ecstasy Anti-Proliferation Act of 2000; Folic Acid Promotion and Birth Defects Prevention Act of 2000; Fragile X Research Breakthrough Act of 2000; Healthy Start Initiative Continuation Act; Hepatitis C and Children Act of 2000; Infant Adoption Awareness Act of 2000; Methamphetamine Anti-Proliferation Act of 2000; NIH Autoimmune Diseases Initiative Act of 2000; Newborn and Infant Hearing Screening and Intervention Act of 2000; Pediatric Organ Transplantation Improvement Act of 2000; Pediatric Research Initiative Act of 2000; Pregnant Mothers and Infants Health Protection Act; Safe Motherhood Monitoring and Prevention Research Act; Traumatic Brain Injury Act Amendments of 2000; Vaccine Injury Compensation Program Amendments Act of 2000; Vaccine Injury Compensation Program Amendments of 2000; Youth Drug and Mental Health Services Act; Children's Health Programs Authorizations bill	Pub. L. 106–310 (text) (PDF)
106-311	October 17, 2000	Youth Drug and Mental Health Services Act	An act to increase the amount of fees charged to employers who are petitioners for the employment of H-1B non-immigrant workers, and for other purposes	Pub. L. 106–311 (text) (PDF)
106-312	October 17, 2000	Truth in Regulating Act of 2000	A bill to amend chapter 8 of title 5, United States Code, to provide for a report by the General Accounting Office to Congress on agency regulatory actions, and for other purposes; A bill to establish a 3-year pilot project for the General Accounting Office to report to Congress on economically significant rules of Federal agencies, and for other purposes; Congressional Accountability for Regulatory Information Act of 1999; Truth in Regulating Act of 1999	Pub. L. 106–312 (text) (PDF)
106-313	October 17, 2000	Kids 2000 Act	A bill to amend the Immigration and Nationality Act with respect to H-1B nonimmigrant aliens; American Competitiveness in the Twenty-first Century Act of 2000; Immigration Services and Infrastructure Improvements Act of 2000; H1-B Visa bill; Nonimmigrant Specialty Worker bill	Pub. L. 106–313 (text) (PDF)
106-314	October 17, 2000	Strengthening Abuse and Neglect Courts Act of 2000	A bill to improve the administrative efficiency and effectiveness of the Nation's abuse and neglect courts and for other purposes consistent with the Adoption and Safe Families Act of 1997	Pub. L. 106–314 (text) (PDF)
106-315	October 19, 2000	(No short title)	An act to designate the building of the United States Postal Service located at 307 Main Street in Johnson City, New York, as the "James W. McCabe, Sr. Post Office Building"	Pub. L. 106–315 (text) (PDF)
106-316	October 19, 2000	(No short title)	An act to reauthorize the Junior Duck Stamp Conservation and Design Program Act of 1994	Pub. L. 106–316 (text) (PDF)
106-317	October 19, 2000	(No short title)	An act to make technical corrections to title X of the Energy Policy Act of 1992	Pub. L. 106–317 (text) (PDF)
106-318	October 19, 2000	Taunton River Wild and Scenic River Study Act of 2000	To amend the Wild and Scenic Rivers Act to designate segments of the Taunton River in the Commonwealth of Massachusetts for study for potential addition to the National Wild and Scenic Rivers System, and for other purposes; Taunton River Wild and Scenic River Study Act of 1999	Pub. L. 106–318 (text) (PDF)
106-319	October 19, 2000	Yuma Crossing National Heritage Area Act of 2000	To establish the Yuma Crossing National Heritage Area; Yuma Crossing National Heritage Area Act of 1999	Pub. L. 106–319 (text) (PDF)
106-320	October 19, 2000	(No short title)	An act to designate the facility of the United States Postal Service located at 424 South Michigan Street in South Bend, Indiana, as the "John Brademas Post Office"	Pub. L. 106–320 (text) (PDF)
106-321	October 19, 2000	(No short title)	An act to designate the facility of the United States Postal Service located at 757 Warren Road in Ithaca, New York, as the "Matthew F. McHugh Post Office"	Pub. L. 106–321 (text) (PDF)
106-322	October 19, 2000	(No short title)	An act to designate the United States post office located at 451 College Street in Macon, Georgia, as the "Henry McNeal Turner Post Office"	Pub. L. 106–322 (text) (PDF)
106-323	October 19, 2000	Effigy Mounds National Monument Additions Act	To authorize the addition of certain parcels to the Effigy Mounds National Monument, Iowa	Pub. L. 106–323 (text) (PDF)
106-324	October 19, 2000	(No short title)	An act to redesignate the Big South Trail in the Comanche Peak Wilderness Area of Roosevelt National Forest in Colorado as the "Jaryd Atadero Legacy Trail"	Pub. L. 106–324 (text) (PDF)
106-325	October 19, 2000	(No short title)	An act to designate the facility of the United States Postal Service located at 4601 South Cottage Grove Avenue in Chicago, Illinois, as the "Henry W. McGee Post Office Building"	Pub. L. 106–325 (text) (PDF)
106-326	October 19, 2000	(No short title)	An act to designate the facility of the United States Postal Service located at 14900 Southwest 30th Street in Miramar City, Florida, as the "Vicki Coceano Post Office Building"	Pub. L. 106–326 (text) (PDF)
106-327	October 19, 2000	(No short title)	An act to designate the facility of the United States Postal Service located at 600 Lincoln Avenue in Pasadena, California, as the "Matthew 'Mack' Robinson Post Office Building"	Pub. L. 106–327 (text) (PDF)
106-328	October 19, 2000	(No short title)	An act to designate the facility of the United States Postal Service located at 2000 Vassar Street in Reno, Nevada, as the "Barbara F. Vucanovich Post Office Building"	Pub. L. 106–328 (text) (PDF)
106-329	October 19, 2000	Black Hills National Forest and Rocky Mountain Research Station Improvement Act	To authorize the Secretary of Agriculture to sell or exchange all or part of certain administrative sites and other land in the Black Hills National Forest and to use funds derived from the sale or exchange to acquire replacement sites and to acquire or construct administrative improvements in connection with the Black Hills National Forest	Pub. L. 106–329 (text) (PDF)
106-330	October 19, 2000	Texas National Forests Improvement Act of 2000	To authorize the Secretary of Agriculture to convey certain administrative sites for National Forest System lands in the State of Texas, to convey certain National Forest System land to the New Waverly Gulf Coast Trades Center, and for other purposes; Texas National Forests Improvement Act of 1999	Pub. L. 106–330 (text) (PDF)
106-331	October 19, 2000	Cahaba River National Wildlife Refuge Establishment Act	To provide for the establishment of the Cahaba River National Wildlife Refuge in Bibb County, Alabama	Pub. L. 106–331 (text) (PDF)
106-332	October 19, 2000	(No short title)	An act to clarify certain boundaries on the map relating to Unit NC01 of the Coastal Barrier Resources System	Pub. L. 106–332 (text) (PDF)
106-333	October 19, 2000	(No short title)	An act to designate the facility of the United States Postal Service located at 919 West 34th Street in Baltimore, Maryland, as the "Samuel H. Lacy, Sr. Post Office Building"	Pub. L. 106–333 (text) (PDF)
106-334	October 19, 2000	(No short title)	An act to designate the facility of the United States Postal Service located at 3500 Dolfield Avenue in Baltimore, Maryland, as the "Judge Robert Bernard Watts, Sr. Post Office Building"	Pub. L. 106–334 (text) (PDF)
106-335	October 19, 2000	(No short title)	An act to designate the facility of the United States Postal Service located at 1908 North Ellamont Street in Baltimore, Maryland, as the "Dr. Flossie McClain Dedmond Post Office Building"	Pub. L. 106–335 (text) (PDF)
106-336	October 19, 2000	(No short title)	An act to designate the facility of the United States Postal Service located at 500 North Washington Street in Rockville, Maryland, as the "Everett Alvarez, Jr. Post Office Building"	Pub. L. 106–336 (text) (PDF)
106-337	October 19, 2000	(No short title)	An act to designate the facility of the United States Postal Service located at 24 Tsienneto Road in Derry, New Hampshire, as the "Alan B. Shepard, Jr. Post Office Building"	Pub. L. 106–337 (text) (PDF)
106-338	October 19, 2000	(No short title)	An act to designate the facility of the United States Postal Service located at 114 Ridge Street in Lenoir, North Carolina, as the "James T. Broyhill Post Office Building"	Pub. L. 106–338 (text) (PDF)
106-339	October 19, 2000	(No short title)	An act to redesignate the facility of the United States Postal Service located at 1602 Frankford Avenue in Philadelphia, Pennsylvania, as the "Joseph F. Smith Post Office Building"	Pub. L. 106–339 (text) (PDF)
106-340	October 19, 2000	(No short title)	An act to redesignate the facility of the United States Postal Service located at 3030 Meredith Avenue in Omaha, Nebraska, as the "Reverend J.C. Wade Post Office"	Pub. L. 106–340 (text) (PDF)
106-341	October 19, 2000	(No short title)	An act to designate the facility of the United States Postal Service located at 301 Green Street in Fayetteville, North Carolina, as the "J.L. Dawkins Post Office Building"	Pub. L. 106–341 (text) (PDF)
106-342	October 19, 2000	(No short title)	An act to redesignate the facility of the United States Postal Service located at 200 West 2nd Street in Royal Oak, Michigan, as the "William S. Broomfield Post Office Building"	Pub. L. 106–342 (text) (PDF)
106-343	October 19, 2000	(No short title)	An act to extend the deadline under the Federal Power Act for commencement of the construction of the Arrowrock Dam Hydroelectric Project in the State of Idaho	Pub. L. 106–343 (text) (PDF)
106-344	October 20, 2000	Making further continuing appropriations for the fiscal year 2001, and for other purposes	Continuing Appropriation FY2001 (Fourth)	Pub. L. 106–344 (text) (PDF)
106-345	October 20, 2000	Ryan White CARE Act Amendments of 2000	A bill to revise and extend the Ryan White CARE Act programs under title XXVI of the Public Health Service Act, to improve access to health care and the quality of health care under such programs, and to provide for the development of increased capacity to provide health care and related support services to individuals and families with HIV disease, and for other purposes; Ryan White CARE Act Programs Authorization bill	Pub. L. 106–345 (text) (PDF)
106-346	October 23, 2000	Department of Transportation and Related Agencies Appropriations Act, 2001	Making appropriations for the Department of Transportation and related agencies for the fiscal year ending September 30, 2001, and for other purposes; Department of Transportation Appropriations Act, FY2001; Transportation Department FY2001 Appropriations bill	Pub. L. 106–346 (text) (PDF)
106-347	October 23, 2000	(No short title)	An act to designate the post office and courthouse located at 2 Federal Square, Newark, New Jersey, as the "Frank R. Lautenberg Post Office and Courthouse"	Pub. L. 106–347 (text) (PDF)
106-348	October 24, 2000	(No short title)	An act to authorize the Disabled Veterans' LIFE Memorial Foundation to establish a memorial in the District of Columbia or its environs to honor veterans who became disabled while serving in the Armed Forces of the United States	Pub. L. 106–348 (text) (PDF)
106-349	October 24, 2000	Carter G. Woodson Home National Historic Site Study Act of 2000	To authorize the Secretary of the Interior to study the suitability and feasibility of designating the Carter G. Woodson Home in the District of Columbia as a National Historic Site, and for other purposes; Carter G. Woodson Home National Historic Site Study Act of 1999	Pub. L. 106–349 (text) (PDF)
106-350	October 24, 2000	Golden Gate National Recreation Area Boundary Adjustment Act of 2000	To revise the boundaries of the Golden Gate National Recreation Area, and for other purposes	Pub. L. 106–350 (text) (PDF)
106-351	October 24, 2000	Santa Rosa and San Jacinto Mountains National Monument Act of 2000	To establish the Santa Rosa and San Jacinto Mountains National Monument in the State of California	Pub. L. 106–351 (text) (PDF)
106-352	October 24, 2000	Rosie the Riveter-World War II Home Front National Historical Park Establishment Act of 2000	To establish the Rosie the Riveter-World War II Home Front National Historical Park in the State of California, and for other purposes; To establish the Rosie the Riveter/World War II Home Front National Historical Park in the State of California, and for other purposes	Pub. L. 106–352 (text) (PDF)
106-353	October 24, 2000	Colorado Canyons National Conservation Area and Black Ridge Canyons Wilderness Act of 2000	To establish the Colorado Canyons National Conservation Area and the Black Ridge Canyons Wilderness, and for other purposes	Pub. L. 106–353 (text) (PDF)
106-354	October 24, 2000	Breast and Cervical Cancer Prevention and Treatment Act of 2000	To amend title XIX of the Social Security Act to provide medical assistance for certain women screened and found to have breast or cervical cancer under a federally funded screening program, to amend the Public Health Service Act and the Federal Food, Drug, and Cosmetic Act with respect to surveillance and information concerning the relationship between cervical cancer and the human papillomavirus (HPV), and for other purposes	Pub. L. 106–354 (text) (PDF)
106-355	October 24, 2000	National Historic Lighthouse Preservation Act of 2000	To amend the National Historic Preservation Act for purposes of establishing a national historic lighthouse preservation program	Pub. L. 106–355 (text) (PDF)
106-356	October 24, 2000	Dayton Aviation Heritage Preservation Amendments Act of 2000	To amend the Dayton Aviation Heritage Preservation Act of 1992 to clarify the areas included in the Dayton Aviation Heritage National Historical Park and to authorize appropriations for that park	Pub. L. 106–356 (text) (PDF)
106-357	October 24, 2000	White Clay Creek Wild and Scenic Rivers System Act	A bill to designate segments and tributaries of White Clay Creek, Delaware and Pennsylvania, as a component of the National Wild and Scenic Rivers System	Pub. L. 106–357 (text) (PDF)
106-358	October 26, 2000	Making further continuing appropriations for the fiscal year 2001, and for other purposes	Continuing Appropriation FY2001 (Fifth)	Pub. L. 106–358 (text) (PDF)
106-359	October 26, 2000	Making further continuing appropriations for the fiscal year 2001, and for other purposes	Continuing Appropriation FY2001 (Sixth)	Pub. L. 106–359 (text) (PDF)
106-360	October 27, 2000	(No short title)	An act to direct the Secretary of the Interior to make technical corrections to a map relating to the Coastal Barrier Resources System	Pub. L. 106–360 (text) (PDF)
106-361	October 27, 2000	(No short title)	An act to amend title 5, United States Code, to allow for the contribution of certain rollover distributions to accounts in the Thrift Savings Plan, to eliminate certain waiting-period requirements for participating in the Thrift Savings Plan, and for other purposes	Pub. L. 106–361 (text) (PDF)
106-362	October 27, 2000	Ivanpah Valley Airport Public Lands Transfer Act	To provide for the conveyance of certain Federal public lands in the Ivanpah Valley, Nevada, to Clark County, Nevada, for the development of an airport facility, and for other purposes	Pub. L. 106–362 (text) (PDF)
106-363	October 27, 2000	Defense Production Act Amendments of 1999	To extend the expiration date of the Defense Production Act of 1950, and for other purposes	Pub. L. 106–363 (text) (PDF)
106-364	October 27, 2000	(No short title)	An act to amend the Revised Organic Act of the Virgin Islands to provide that the number of members on the legislature of the Virgin Islands and the number of such members constituting a quorum shall be determined by the laws of the Virgin Islands, and for other purposes	Pub. L. 106–364 (text) (PDF)
106-365	October 27, 2000	(No short title)	An act to provide for the placement at the Lincoln Memorial of a plaque commemorating the speech of Martin Luther King, Jr., known as the "I Have A Dream" speech	Pub. L. 106–365 (text) (PDF)
106-366	October 27, 2000	(No short title)	An act to direct the Secretary of the Interior, through the Bureau of Reclamation, to convey to the Loup Basin Reclamation District, the Sargent River Irrigation District, and the Farwell Irrigation District, Nebraska, property comprising the assets of the Middle Loup Division of the Missouri River Basin Project, Nebraska	Pub. L. 106–366 (text) (PDF)
106-367	October 27, 2000	National Police Athletic League Youth Enrichment Act of 2000	To improve academic and social outcomes for youth and reduce both juvenile crime and the risk that youth will become victims of crime by providing productive activities conducted by law enforcement personnel during non-school hours; National Police Athletic League Youth Enrichment Act of 1999	Pub. L. 106–367 (text) (PDF)
106-368	October 27, 2000	National Police Athletic League Youth Enrichment Act of 1999	An act to authorize the Secretary of the Interior to enter into contracts with the Weber Basin Water Conservancy District, Utah, to use Weber Basin Project facilities for the impounding, storage, and carriage of nonproject water for domestic, municipal, industrial, and other beneficial purposes	Pub. L. 106–368 (text) (PDF)
106-369	October 27, 2000	Cat Island National Wildlife Refuge Establishment Act	To provide for the establishment of the Cat Island National Wildlife Refuge in West Feliciana Parish, Louisiana	Pub. L. 106–369 (text) (PDF)
106-370	October 27, 2000	Duchesne City Water Rights Conveyance Act	To direct the Secretary of the Interior to convey to certain water rights to Duchesne City, Utah	Pub. L. 106–370 (text) (PDF)
106-371	October 27, 2000	(No short title)	An act to increase the amount authorized to be appropriated for the north side pumping division of the Minidoka reclamation project, Idaho	Pub. L. 106–371 (text) (PDF)
106-372	October 27, 2000	(No short title)	An act to provide for a study of the engineering feasibility of a water exchange in lieu of electrification of the Chandler Pumping Plant at Prosser Diversion Dam, Washington	Pub. L. 106–372 (text) (PDF)
106-373	October 27, 2000	Famine Prevention and Freedom From Hunger Improvement Act of 2000	To amend the Foreign Assistance Act of 1961 to revise and improve provisions relating to famine prevention and freedom from hunger	Pub. L. 106–373 (text) (PDF)
106-374	October 27, 2000	(No short title)	An act to reauthorize grants for water resources research and technology institutes established under the Water Resources Research Act of 1984	Pub. L. 106–374 (text) (PDF)
106-375	October 27, 2000	American Buffalo Coin Commemorative Coin Act of 2000	To require the Secretary of the Treasury to mint coins in commemoration of the National Museum of the American Indian of the Smithsonian Institution, and for other purposes; National Museum of the American Indian Commemorative Coin Act of 2000	Pub. L. 106–375 (text) (PDF)
106-376	October 27, 2000	National Museum of the American Indian Commemorative Coin Act of 2000	An act to direct the Secretary of the Interior to convey certain water distribution facilities to the Northern Colorado Water Conservancy District	Pub. L. 106–376 (text) (PDF)
106-377	October 27, 2000	Department of Veterans Affairs and Housing and Urban Development, and Independent Agencies Appropriations Act, 2001	Making appropriations for the Departments of Veterans Affairs and Housing and Urban Development, and for sundry independent agencies, boards, commissions, corporations, and offices for the fiscal year ending September 30, 2001, and for other purposes; Departments of Veterans Affairs and Housing and Urban Development, and Independent Agencies Appropriations Act, 2001; Appropriations bill FY2001, HUD; Appropriations bill FY2001, Veterans Affairs, HUD; Housing and Urban Development FY2001 Appropriations bill; Veterans Affairs FY2001 Appropriations bill	Pub. L. 106–377 (text) (PDF)
106-378	October 27, 2000	Departments of Veterans Affairs and Housing and Urban Development, and Independent Agencies Appropriations Act, 2001	An act to provide for the adjustment of status of certain Syrian nationals	Pub. L. 106–378 (text) (PDF)
106-379	October 27, 2000	Work Made for Hire and Copyright Corrections Act of 2000	To make certain corrections in copyright law	Pub. L. 106–379 (text) (PDF)
106-380	October 27, 2000	Veterans' Oral History Project Act	To direct the American Folklife Center at the Library of Congress to establish a program to collect video and audio recordings of personal histories and testimonials of American war veterans, and for other purposes	Pub. L. 106–380 (text) (PDF)
106-381	October 27, 2000	Making further continuing appropriations for the fiscal year 2001, and for other purposes	Continuing Appropriation FY2001 (Seventh)	Pub. L. 106–381 (text) (PDF)
106-382	October 27, 2000	Fort Peck Reservation Rural Water System Act of 2000	A bill to authorize construction of the Fort Peck Reservation Rural Water System in the State of Montana, and for other purposes; Fort Peck Reservation Rural Water System Act of 1999	Pub. L. 106–382 (text) (PDF)
106-383	October 27, 2000	Fort Peck Reservation Rural Water System Act of 1999	An act to authorize the Smithsonian Institution to plan, design, construct, and equip laboratory, administrative, and support space to house base operations for the Smithsonian Astrophysical Observatory Submillimeter Array located on Mauna Kea at Hilo, Hawaii	Pub. L. 106–383 (text) (PDF)
106-384	October 27, 2000	(No short title)	An act to amend chapter 36 of title 39, United States Code, to modify rates relating to reduced rate mail matter, and for other purposes	Pub. L. 106–384 (text) (PDF)
106-385	October 27, 2000	(No short title)	An act to rename the National Museum of American Art	Pub. L. 106–385 (text) (PDF)
106-386	October 28, 2000	Victims of Trafficking and Violence Protection Act of 2000	To combat trafficking of persons, especially into the sex trade, slavery, and slavery-like conditions in the United States and countries around the world through prevention, through prosecution and enforcement against traffickers, and through protection and assistance to victims of trafficking; Aimee's Law; Battered Immigrant Women Protection Act of 2000; Campus Sex Crimes Prevention Act; Teen Suicide Prevention Act of 2000; Trafficking Victims Protection Act of 1999; Trafficking Victims Protection Act of 2000; Violence Against Women Act of 2000; Human Trafficking bill; Sexual Trafficking Victims Protection bill; Violence Against Women Act Authorization bill	Pub. L. 106–386 (text) (PDF)
106-387	October 28, 2000	Agriculture, Rural Development, Food and Drug Administration, and Related Agencies Appropriations Act, 2001	Making appropriations for Agriculture, Rural Development, Food and Drug Administration and Related Agencies programs for the fiscal year ending September 30, 2001, and for other purposes; Conservation of Farmable Wetland Act of 2000; Continued Dumping and Subsidy Offset Act of 2000; Hass Avocado Promotion, Research, and Information Act of 2000; Medicine Equity and Drug Safety Act of 2000; Prescription Drug Import Fairness Act of 2000; Trade Sanctions Reform and Export Enhancement Act of 2000; FY2001 Agriculture Appropriations bill	Pub. L. 106–387 (text) (PDF)
106-388	October 28, 2000	Making further continuing appropriations for the fiscal year 2001, and for other purposes	Continuing Appropriation FY2001 (Eighth)	Pub. L. 106–388 (text) (PDF)
106-389	October 29, 2000	Making further continuing appropriations for the fiscal year 2001, and for other purposes	Continuing Appropriation FY2001 (Ninth)	Pub. L. 106–389 (text) (PDF)
106-390	October 30, 2000	Disaster Mitigation Act of 2000	To amend the Robert T. Stafford Disaster Relief and Emergency Assistance Act to authorize a program for predisaster mitigation, to streamline the administration of disaster relief, to control the Federal costs of disaster assistance, and for other purposes; Disaster Mitigation and Cost Reduction Act of 1999	Pub. L. 106–390 (text) (PDF)
106-391	October 30, 2000	National Aeronautics and Space Administration Authorization Act of 2000	To authorize appropriations for the National Aeronautics and Space Administration for fiscal years 2000, 2001, and 2002, and for other purposes; National Aeronautics and Space Administration Authorization Act for Fiscal Years 2000, 2001, and 2002; National Aeronautics and Space Administration Authorization Act of 1999; FY2000-2002 NASA Authorization bill; NASA Authorization bill	Pub. L. 106–391 (text) (PDF)
106-392	October 30, 2000	National Aeronautics and Space Administration Authorization Act of 1999	An act to authorize the Bureau of Reclamation to provide cost sharing for the endangered fish recovery implementation programs for the Upper Colorado and San Juan River Basins	Pub. L. 106–392 (text) (PDF)
106-393	October 30, 2000	Secure Rural Schools and Community Self-Determination Act of 2000	To restore stability and predictability to the annual payments made to States and counties containing National Forest System lands and public domain lands managed by the Bureau of Land Management for use by the counties for the benefit of public schools, roads, and other purposes; Community Forest Restoration Act; County Schools Funding Revitalization Act of 1999; Mineral Revenue Payments Clarification Act of 2000; Secure Rural Schools and Community Self-Determination Act of 1999	Pub. L. 106–393 (text) (PDF)
106-394	October 30, 2000	Federal Employees Health Benefits Children's Equity Act of 2000	To amend chapter 89 of title 5, United States Code, concerning the Federal Employees Health Benefits (FEHB) Program, to enable the Federal Government to enroll an employee and his or her family in the FEHB Program when a State court orders the employee to provide health insurance coverage for a child of the employee but the employee fails to provide the coverage; Federal Employees Health Benefits Children's Equity Act of 1999	Pub. L. 106–394 (text) (PDF)
106-395	October 30, 2000	Child Citizenship Act of 2000	To amend the Immigration and Nationality Act to confer United States citizenship automatically and retroactively on certain foreign-born children adopted by citizens of the United States; Adopted Orphans Citizenship Act	Pub. L. 106–395 (text) (PDF)
106-396	October 30, 2000	Visa Waiver Permanent Program Act	To amend the Immigration and Nationality Act to make improvements to, and permanently authorize, the visa waiver pilot program under section 217 of such Act; Visa Waiver Pilot Program bill; Visa Waiver bill	Pub. L. 106–396 (text) (PDF)
106-397	October 30, 2000	District of Columbia Receivership Accountability Act of 2000	To establish procedures governing the responsibilities of court-appointed receivers who administer departments, offices, and agencies of the District of Columbia government	Pub. L. 106–397 (text) (PDF)
106-398	October 30, 2000	Floyd D. Spence National Defense Authorization Act for Fiscal Year 2001	To authorize appropriations for fiscal year 2001 for military activities of the Department of Defense and for military construction, to prescribe military personnel strengths for fiscal year 2001, and for other purposes; To authorize appropriations for fiscal year 2001 for military activities of the Department of Defense, for military construction, and for defense activities of the Department of Energy, to prescribe personnel strengths for such fiscal year for the Armed Forces, and for other purposes; Energy Employees Occupational Illness Compensation Act of 2000; Energy Employees Occupational Illness Compensation Program Act of 2000; Government Information Security Act; Helping Our Professionals Educationally (HOPE) Act of 2000; Impact Aid Reauthorization Act of 2000; Local Law Enforcement Enhancement Act of 2000; Military Construction Authorization Act for Fiscal Year 2001; Military Voting Rights Act of 2000; National Defense Authorization Act for Fiscal Year 2001; National Laboratories Partnership Improvement Act of 2000; Russian Nuclear Weapons Complex Conversion Act of 2000; Ute-Moab Land Restoration Act; Defense Authorization bill; Defense and Military Construction Authorization bill, FY2001	Pub. L. 106–398 (text) (PDF)
106-399	October 30, 2000	Steens Mountain Cooperative Management and Protection Act of 2000	To designate wilderness areas and a cooperative management and protection area in the vicinity of Steens Mountain in Harney County, Oregon, and for other purposes; Steens Mountain Wilderness Act of 2000	Pub. L. 106–399 (text) (PDF)
106-400	October 30, 2000	McKinney-Vento Homeless Assistance Act	To rename the Stewart B. McKinney Homeless Assistance Act as the "McKinney-Vento Homeless Assistance Act"	Pub. L. 106–400 (text) (PDF)
106-401	October 30, 2000	Making further continuing appropriations for the fiscal year 2001, and for other purposes	Continuing Appropriation FY2001 (Tenth)	Pub. L. 106–401 (text) (PDF)
106-402	October 30, 2000	Developmental Disabilities Assistance and Bill of Rights Act of 2000	A bill to improve service systems for individuals with developmental disabilities, and for other purposes; Developmental Disabilities Assistance and Bill of Rights Act of 1999; Families of Children With Disabilities Support Act of 1999; Families of Children with Disabilities Support Act of 1999	Pub. L. 106–402 (text) (PDF)
106-403	November 1, 2000	Making further continuing appropriations for the fiscal year 2001, and for other purposes	Continuing Appropriation FY2001 (Eleventh)	Pub. L. 106–403 (text) (PDF)
106-404	November 1, 2000	Technology Transfer Commercialization Act of 2000	To improve the ability of Federal agencies to license federally owned inventions; Technology Transfer Commercialization Act of 1999	Pub. L. 106–404 (text) (PDF)
106-405	November 1, 2000	Commercial Space Transportation Competitiveness Act of 2000	To promote the development of the commercial space transportation industry, to authorize appropriations for the Office of the Associate Administrator for Commercial Space Transportation, to authorize appropriations for the Office of Space Commercialization, and for other purposes; Commercial Space Transportation Competitiveness Act of 1999	Pub. L. 106–405 (text) (PDF)
106-406	November 1, 2000	International Patient Act of 2000	To amend the Immigration and Nationality Act to authorize a 3-year pilot program under which the Attorney General may extend the period for voluntary departure in the case of certain nonimmigrant aliens who require medical treatment in the United States and were admitted under the Visa Waiver Pilot Program, and for other purposes; International Patient Act of 1999	Pub. L. 106–406 (text) (PDF)
106-407	November 1, 2000	Southeast Federal Center Public-Private Development Act of 2000	To authorize the Administrator of General Services to provide for redevelopment of the Southeast Federal Center in the District of Columbia; Southeast Federal Center Public-Private Development Act of 1999	Pub. L. 106–407 (text) (PDF)
106-408	November 1, 2000	Fish and Wildlife Programs Improvement and National Wildlife Refuge System Centennial Act of 2000	A bill to amend the Pittman-Robertson Wildlife Restoration Act and the Dingell-Johnson Sport Fish Restoration Act to enhance the funds available for grants to States for fish and wildlife conservation projects, to reauthorize and amend the National Fish and Wildlife Foundation Establishment Act, to commemorate the centennial of the establishment of the first national wildlife refuge in the United States on March 14, 1903, and for other purposes; To amend the Acts popularly known as the Pittman-Robertson Wildlife Restoration Act and the Dingell-Johnson Sport Fish Restoration Act to enhance the funds available for grants to States for fish and wildlife conservation projects and increase opportunities for recreational hunting, bow hunting, trapping, archery, and fishing, by eliminating opportunities for waste, fraud, abuse, maladministration, and unauthorized expenditures for administration and execution of those Acts, and for other purposes; Dingell-Johnson Sport Fish Restoration Act; National Fish and Wildlife Foundation Establishment Act Amendments of 2000; National Wildlife Refuge System Centennial Act; Wildlife and Sport Fish Restoration Programs Improvement Act of 2000; Wildlife and Sport Fish Restoration bill	Pub. L. 106–408 (text) (PDF)
106-409	November 1, 2000	Religious Workers Act of 2000	To amend the Immigration and Nationality Act to extend for an additional 3 years the special immigrant religious worker program	Pub. L. 106–409 (text) (PDF)
106-410	November 1, 2000	Wildlife and Sport Fish Restoration Programs Improvement Act of 2000	An act to amend title 44, United States Code, to authorize appropriations for the National Historical Publications and Records Commission for fiscal years 2002 through 2005	Pub. L. 106–410 (text) (PDF)
106-411	November 1, 2000	Great Ape Conservation Act of 2000	To assist in the conservation of great apes by supporting and providing financial resources for the conservation programs of countries within the range of great apes and projects of persons with demonstrated expertise in the conservation of great apes	Pub. L. 106–411 (text) (PDF)
106-412	November 1, 2000	(No short title)	An act to authorize the exchange of land between the Secretary of the Interior and the Director of Central Intelligence at the George Washington Memorial Parkway in McLean, Virginia, and for other purposes	Pub. L. 106–412 (text) (PDF)
106-413	November 1, 2000	Veterans' Compensation Cost-of-Living Adjustment Act of 2000	A bill to increase, effective as of December 1, 2000, the rates of compensation for veterans with service-connected disabilities and the rates of dependency and indemnity compensation for the survivors of certain disabled veterans; To provide a cost-of-living adjustment in rates of compensation paid to veterans with service-connected disabilities, to enhance programs providing compensation and life insurance benefits for veterans, and for other purposes; Veterans Benefits Act of 2000	Pub. L. 106–413 (text) (PDF)
106-414	November 1, 2000	Transportation Recall Enhancement, Accountability, and Documentation (TREAD) Act	To amend title 49, United States Code, to require reports concerning defects in motor vehicles or tires or other motor vehicle equipment in foreign countries, and for other purposes; Transportation Recall Enhancement, Accountability and Documentation Act; Tire Recall bill	Pub. L. 106–414 (text) (PDF)
106-415	November 1, 2000	(No short title)	An act to amend the Hmong Veterans' Naturalization Act of 2000 to extend the applicability of that Act to certain former spouses of deceased Hmong veterans	Pub. L. 106–415 (text) (PDF)
106-416	November 1, 2000	Making further continuing appropriations for the fiscal year 2001, and for other purposes	Continuing Appropriation FY2001 (Twelfth)	Pub. L. 106–416 (text) (PDF)
106-417	November 1, 2000	Alaska Native and American Indian Direct Reimbursement Act of 2000	A bill to amend the Indian Health Care Improvement Act to make permanent the demonstration program that allows for direct billing of medicare, medicaid, and other third party payors, and to expand the eligibility under such program to other tribes and tribal organizations; Alaska Native and American Indian Direct Reimbursement Act of 1999	Pub. L. 106–417 (text) (PDF)
106-418	November 1, 2000	Lower Delaware Wild and Scenic Rivers Act	A bill to designate portions of the lower Delaware River and associated tributaries as a component of the National Wild and Scenic Rivers System	Pub. L. 106–418 (text) (PDF)
106-419	November 1, 2000	Veterans Benefits and Health Care Improvement Act of 2000	A bill to amend title 38, United States Code, to increase the rates of educational assistance under the Montgomery GI Bill, to improve procedures for the adjustment of rates of pay for nurses employed by the Department of Veterans Affairs, to make other improvements in veterans educational assistance, health care, and benefits programs, and for other purposes; An Act to amend title 38, United States Code, to increase amounts of educational assistance for veterans under the Montgomery GI Bill and to enhance programs providing educational benefits under that title, and for; An original bill to amend title 38, United States Code, to enhance programs providing education benefits for veterans, and for other purposes; other purposes; All-Volunteer Force Educational Assistance Programs Improvements Act of 1999; Veterans and Dependents Millennium Education Act	Pub. L. 106–419 (text) (PDF)
106-420	November 1, 2000	College Scholarship Fraud Prevention Act of 2000	A bill to enhance protections against fraud in the offering of financial assistance for college education, and for other purposes; College Scholarship Fraud Prevention Act of 1999	Pub. L. 106–420 (text) (PDF)
106-421	November 1, 2000	Castle Rock Ranch Acquisition Act of 2000	A bill to direct the Secretary of the Interior to enter into land exchanges to acquire from the private owner and to convey to the State of Idaho approximately 1,240 acres of land near the City of Rocks National Reserve, Idaho, and for other purposes; Castle Rock Ranch Acquisition Act of 1999	Pub. L. 106–421 (text) (PDF)
106-422	November 1, 2000	Castle Rock Ranch Acquisition Act of 1999	An act to amend the Inspector General Act of 1978 (5 U.S.C. App.) to provide that certain designated Federal entities shall be establishments under such Act, and for other purposes	Pub. L. 106–422 (text) (PDF)
106-423	November 1, 2000	Timbisha Shoshone Homeland Act	A bill to provide to the Timbisha Shoshone Tribe a permanent land base within its aboriginal homeland, and for other purposes	Pub. L. 106–423 (text) (PDF)
106-424	November 1, 2000	National Transportation Safety Board Amendments Act of 2000	A bill to amend title 49, United States Code, to authorize appropriations for the National Transportation Safety Board for fiscal years 2000, 2001, 2002, and 2003, and for other purposes; National Transportation Safety Board Amendments Act of 2000	Pub. L. 106–424 (text) (PDF)
106-425	November 1, 2000	Santo Domingo Pueblo Claims Settlement Act of 2000	A bill to settle the land claims of the Pueblo of Santo Domingo	Pub. L. 106–425 (text) (PDF)
106-426	November 3, 2000	Making further continuing appropriations for the fiscal year 2001, and for other purposes	Continuing Appropriation FY2001 (Thirteenth)	Pub. L. 106–426 (text) (PDF)
106-427	November 4, 2000	Making further continuing appropriations for the fiscal year 2001, and for other purposes	Continuing Appropriation FY2001 (Fourteenth)	Pub. L. 106–427 (text) (PDF)
106-428	November 4, 2000	Making further continuing appropriations for the fiscal year 2001, and for other purposes	Making further continuing appropriations for the fiscal year 2000, and for other purposes; Continuing Appropriation FY2001 (Fifteenth)	Pub. L. 106–428 (text) (PDF)
106-429	November 6, 2000	Foreign Operations, Export Financing, and Related Programs Appropriations Act, 2001	Making appropriations for foreign operations, export financing, and related programs for the fiscal year ending September 30, 2001, and for other purposes; Kentucky National Forest Land Transfer Act of 2000; Adjustment of 2001 Discretionary Spending Caps bill; Appropriations bill FY2001, Foreign Operations; Foreign Operations FY2001, Appropriations bill	Pub. L. 106–429 (text) (PDF)
106-430	November 6, 2000	Needlestick Safety and Prevention Act	To require changes in the bloodborne pathogens standard in effect under the Occupational Safety and Health Act of 1970	Pub. L. 106–430 (text) (PDF)
106-431	November 6, 2000	Saint Helena Island National Scenic Area Act	To establish the Saint Helena Island National Scenic Area	Pub. L. 106–431 (text) (PDF)
106-432	November 6, 2000	Miwaleta Park Expansion Act	To provide for the conveyance by the Bureau of Land Management to Douglas County, Oregon, of a county park and certain adjacent land	Pub. L. 106–432 (text) (PDF)
106-433	November 6, 2000	Social Security Number Confidentiality Act of 2000	To amend title 31, United States Code, to prohibit the appearance of Social Security account numbers on or through unopened mailings of checks or other drafts issued on public money in the Treasury; Social Security Number Confidentiality Act of 1999	Pub. L. 106–433 (text) (PDF)
106-434	November 6, 2000	Social Security Number Confidentiality Act of 1999	An act to provide for the conveyance of a small parcel of public domain land in the San Bernardino National Forest in the State of California, and for other purposes	Pub. L. 106–434 (text) (PDF)
106-435	November 6, 2000	(No short title)	To provide for the minting of commemorative coins to support the 2002 Salt Lake Olympic Winter Games and the programs of the United States Olympic Committee	Pub. L. 106–435 (text) (PDF)
106-436	November 6, 2000	(No short title)	An act to designate the facility of the United States Postal Service located at 3695 Green Road in Beachwood, Ohio, as the "Larry Small Post Office Building"	Pub. L. 106–436 (text) (PDF)
106-437	November 6, 2000	(No short title)	An act to permit the payment of medical expenses incurred by the United States Park Police in the performance of duty to be made directly by the National Park Service, to allow for waiver and indemnification in mutual law enforcement agreements between the National Park Service and a State or political subdivision when required by State law, and for other purposes	Pub. L. 106–437 (text) (PDF)
106-438	November 6, 2000	(No short title)	An act to designate the facility of the United States Postal Service located at 900 East Fayette Street in Baltimore, Maryland, as the "Judge Harry Augustus Cole Post Office Building"	Pub. L. 106–438 (text) (PDF)
106-439	November 6, 2000	(No short title)	An act to designate the facility of the United States Postal Service located at 1001 Frederick Road in Baltimore, Maryland, as the "Frederick L. Dewberry, Jr. Post Office Building"	Pub. L. 106–439 (text) (PDF)
106-440	November 6, 2000	(No short title)	An act to designate the facility of the United States Postal Service located at 2108 East 38th Street in Erie, Pennsylvania, as the "Gertrude A. Barber Post Office Building"	Pub. L. 106–440 (text) (PDF)
106-441	November 6, 2000	(No short title)	An act to designate the facility of the United States Postal Service located at 110 Postal Way in Carrollton, Georgia, as the "Samuel P. Roberts Post Office Building"	Pub. L. 106–441 (text) (PDF)
106-442	November 6, 2000	(No short title)	An act to amend the Omnibus Parks and Public Lands Management Act of 1996 to extend the legislative authority for the Black Patriots Foundation to establish a commemorative work	Pub. L. 106–442 (text) (PDF)
106-443	November 6, 2000	(No short title)	An act to extend the authority of the Los Angeles Unified School District to use certain park lands in the city of South Gate, California, which were acquired with amounts provided from the land and water conservation fund, for elementary school purposes	Pub. L. 106–443 (text) (PDF)
106-444	November 6, 2000	Freedmen's Bureau Records Preservation Act of 2000	To amend title 44, United States Code, to ensure preservation of the records of the Freedmen's Bureau	Pub. L. 106–444 (text) (PDF)
106-445	November 6, 2000	United States Mint Numismatic Coin Clarification Act of 2000	To clarify the intention of the Congress with regard to the authority of the United States Mint to produce numismatic coins, and for other purposes	Pub. L. 106–445 (text) (PDF)
106-446	November 6, 2000	(No short title)	An act to require the immediate termination of the Department of Defense practice of euthanizing military working dogs at the end of their useful working life and to facilitate the adoption of retired military working dogs by law enforcement agencies, former handlers of these dogs, and other persons capable of caring for these dogs	Pub. L. 106–446 (text) (PDF)
106-447	November 6, 2000	Indian Tribal Regulatory Reform and Business Development Act of 2000	A bill to provide for regulatory reform in order to encourage investment, business, and economic development with respect to activities conducted on Indian lands; Indian Tribal Regulatory Reform and Business Development Act of 1999	Pub. L. 106–447 (text) (PDF)
106-448	November 6, 2000	Indian Tribal Regulatory Reform and Business Development Act of 1999	An act to amend the Immigration and Nationality Act to provide a waiver of the oath of renunciation and allegiance for naturalization of aliens having certain disabilities	Pub. L. 106–448 (text) (PDF)
106-449	November 6, 2000	(No short title)	An act to modify the date on which the Mayor of the District of Columbia submits a performance accountability plan to Congress, and for other purposes	Pub. L. 106–449 (text) (PDF)
106-450	November 7, 2000	Fishermen's Protective Act Amendments of 2000	To amend the Fishermen's Protective Act of 1967 to extend the period during which reimbursement may be provided to owners of United States fishing vessels for costs incurred when such a vessel is seized and detained by a foreign country; Fisheries Survey Vessel Authorization Act of 1999; Fisheries Survey Vessel Authorization Act of 2000; Fishermen's Protective Act Amendments of 1999; Yukon River Salmon Act of 1999; Yukon River Salmon Act of 2000	Pub. L. 106–450 (text) (PDF)
106-451	November 7, 2000	Wartime Violation of Italian American Civil Liberties Act	To provide for the preparation of a Government report detailing injustices suffered by Italian Americans during World War II, and a formal acknowledgment of such injustices by the President	Pub. L. 106–451 (text) (PDF)
106-452	November 7, 2000	Yukon River Salmon Act of 2000	An act to redesignate the facility of the United States Postal Service located at 2339 North California Street in Chicago, Illinois, as the "Roberto Clemente Post Office"	Pub. L. 106–452 (text) (PDF)
106-453	November 7, 2000	(No short title)	An act to redesignate the facility of the United States Postal Service located at 1568 South Glen Road in South Euclid, Ohio, as the "Arnold C. D'Amico Station"	Pub. L. 106–453 (text) (PDF)
106-454	November 7, 2000	(No short title)	An act to designate the facility of the United States Postal Service located at 219 South Church Street in Odum, Georgia, as the "Ruth Harris Coleman Post Office"	Pub. L. 106–454 (text) (PDF)
106-455	November 7, 2000	Glacier Bay National Park Resource Management Act of 2000	A bill to address resource management issues in Glacier Bay National Park Alaska; Glacier Bay Fisheries Act; Glacier Bay National Park Resource Management Act of 1999	Pub. L. 106–455 (text) (PDF)
106-456	November 7, 2000	Spanish Peaks Wilderness Act of 2000	A bill designating certain land in the San Isabel National Forest in the State of Colorado as the "Spanish Peaks Wilderness"; Spanish Peaks Wilderness Act of 1999	Pub. L. 106–456 (text) (PDF)
106-457	November 7, 2000	Estuaries and Clean Waters Act of 2000	A bill to encourage the restoration of estuary habitat through more efficient project financing and enhanced coordination of Federal and non-Federal restoration programs, and for other purposes; Alternative Water Sources Act of 2000; Chesapeake Bay Restoration Act of 2000; Estuary Habitat Restoration Partnership Act of 1999; Estuary Habitat Restoration Partnership Act of 2000; Estuary Habitat and Chesapeake Bay Restoration Act of 2000; Estuary Restoration Act of 2000; Lake Pontchartrain Basin Restoration Act of 2000; Long Island Sound Restoration Act; Tijuana River Valley Estuary and Beach Sewage Cleanup Act of 2000	Pub. L. 106–457 (text) (PDF)
106-458	November 7, 2000	Arizona National Forest Improvement Act of 2000	A bill to authorize the Secretary of Agriculture to convey certain administrative sites in national forests in the State of Arizona, to convey certain land to the City of Sedona, Arizona for a wastewater treatment facility, and for other purposes; Arizona National Forest Improvement Act of 1999	Pub. L. 106–458 (text) (PDF)
106-459	November 7, 2000	Arizona National Forest Improvement Act of 1999	An act to amend the Colorado River Basin Salinity Control Act to authorize additional measures to carry out the control of salinity upstream of Imperial Dam in a cost-effective manner	Pub. L. 106–459 (text) (PDF)
106-460	November 7, 2000	(No short title)	An act to direct the Secretary of the Interior to issue to the Landusky School District, without consideration, a patent for the surface and mineral estates of certain lots, and for other purposes	Pub. L. 106–460 (text) (PDF)
106-461	November 7, 2000	Hoover Dam Miscellaneous Sales Act	A bill to authorize the Secretary of the Interior to produce and sell products and to sell publications relating to the Hoover Dam, and to deposit revenues generated from the sales into the Colorado River Dam fund	Pub. L. 106–461 (text) (PDF)
106-462	November 7, 2000	Indian Land Consolidation Act Amendments of 2000	A bill to reduce the fractionated ownership of Indian Lands, and for other purposes; Indian Land Consolidation Act Amendments of 1999	Pub. L. 106–462 (text) (PDF)
106-463	November 7, 2000	Coal Market Competition Act of 2000	A bill to amend the Mineral Leasing Act to increase the maximum acreage of Federal leases for coal that may be held by an entity in any 1 State	Pub. L. 106–463 (text) (PDF)
106-464	November 7, 2000	Native American Business Development, Trade Promotion, and Tourism Act of 2000	A bill to provide for business development and trade promotion for Native Americans, and for other purposes	Pub. L. 106–464 (text) (PDF)
106-465	November 7, 2000	Sand Creek Massacre National Historic Site Establishment Act of 2000	A bill to authorize the Secretary of the Interior to establish the Sand Creek Massacre Historic Site in the State of Colorado	Pub. L. 106–465 (text) (PDF)
106-466	November 7, 2000	Nampa and Meridian Conveyance Act	A bill to direct the Secretary of the Interior to convey certain irrigation facilities to the Nampa and Meridian Irrigation District	Pub. L. 106–466 (text) (PDF)
106-467	November 9, 2000	Indian Land Consolidation Act Amendments of 1999	An act to authorize the Secretary of the Interior to enter into contracts with the Solano County Water Agency, California, to use Solano Project facilities for impounding, storage, and carriage of nonproject water for domestic, municipal, industrial, and other beneficial purposes	Pub. L. 106–467 (text) (PDF)
106-468	November 9, 2000	Kristen's Act	To authorize the Attorney General to provide grants for organizations to find missing adults	Pub. L. 106–468 (text) (PDF)
106-469	November 9, 2000	Energy Act of 2000	To extend energy conservation programs under the Energy Policy and Conservation Act through fiscal year 2003; Energy Policy and Conservation Act Amendments of 2000; Energy Policy and Conservation Act Amendments of 2000; National Oilheat Research Alliance Act of 2000; Strategic Petroleum Reserve Reauthorization bill	Pub. L. 106–469 (text) (PDF)
106-470	November 9, 2000	Upper Housatonic National Heritage Area Study Act of 2000	To direct the Secretary of the Interior to conduct a study of the suitability and feasibility of establishing an Upper Housatonic Valley National Heritage Area in the State of Connecticut and the Commonwealth of Massachusetts, and for other purposes	Pub. L. 106–470 (text) (PDF)
106-471	November 9, 2000	National Oilheat Research Alliance Act of 2000	An act to designate certain National Forest System lands within the boundaries of the State of Virginia as wilderness areas, and for other purposes	Pub. L. 106–471 (text) (PDF)
106-472	November 9, 2000	Grain Standards and Warehouse Improvement Act of 2000	To amend the United States Grain Standards Act to extend the authority of the Secretary of Agriculture to collect fees to cover the cost of services performed under the Act, to extend the authorization of appropriations for the Act, and to improve the administration of the Act; United States Grain Standards Reauthorization Act of 2000; United States Warehouse Act	Pub. L. 106–472 (text) (PDF)
106-473	November 9, 2000	Washington-Rochambeau Revolutionary Route National Heritage Act of 2000	To require the Secretary of the Interior to complete a resource study of the 600 mile route through Connecticut, Delaware, Maryland, Massachusetts, New Jersey, New York, Pennsylvania, Rhode Island, and Virginia, used by George Washington and General Rochambeau during the American Revolutionary War	Pub. L. 106–473 (text) (PDF)
106-474	November 9, 2000	National Recording Preservation Act of 2000	A bill to establish the National Recording Registry in the Library of Congress to maintain and preserve sound recordings and collections of sound recordings that are culturally, historically, or aesthetically significant, and for other purposes; To establish the National Recording Registry in the Library of Congress to maintain and preserve recordings that are culturally, historically, or aesthetically significant, and for other purposes	Pub. L. 106–474 (text) (PDF)
106-475	November 9, 2000	Veterans Claims Assistance Act of 2000	To amend title 38, United States Code, to reaffirm and clarify the duty of the Secretary of Veterans Affairs to assist claimants for benefits under laws administered by the Secretary, and for other purposes	Pub. L. 106–475 (text) (PDF)
106-476	November 9, 2000	Tariff Suspension and Trade Act of 2000	To amend the Harmonized Tariff Schedule of the United States to modify temporarily certain rates of duty, to make other technical amendments to the trade laws, and for other purposes; Dog and Cat Protection Act of 2000; Imported Cigarette Compliance Act of 2000; Miscellaneous Trade and Technical Corrections Act of 2000; Product Development and Testing Act of 2000	Pub. L. 106–476 (text) (PDF)
106-477	November 9, 2000	Product Development and Testing Act of 2000	An act to designate the United States courthouse located at 3470 12th Street in Riverside, California, as the "George E. Brown, Jr. United States Courthouse"	Pub. L. 106–477 (text) (PDF)
106-478	November 9, 2000	(No short title)	An act to designate the United States courthouse located at 1010 Fifth Avenue in Seattle, Washington, as the "William Kenzo Nakamura United States Courthouse"	Pub. L. 106–478 (text) (PDF)
106-479	November 9, 2000	(No short title)	An act to authorize the Frederick Douglass Gardens, Inc., to establish a memorial and gardens on Department of the Interior lands in the District of Columbia or its environs in honor and commemoration of Frederick Douglass	Pub. L. 106–479 (text) (PDF)
106-480	November 9, 2000	(No short title)	An act to designate a building proposed to be located within the boundaries of the Chincoteague National Wildlife Refuge, as the "Herbert H. Bateman Educational and Administrative Center"	Pub. L. 106–480 (text) (PDF)
106-481	November 9, 2000	Library of Congress Fiscal Operations Improvement Act of 2000	To establish revolving funds for the operation of certain programs and activities of the Library of Congress, and for other purposes	Pub. L. 106–481 (text) (PDF)
106-482	November 9, 2000	(No short title)	An act to authorize the Secretary of the Interior to acquire by donation suitable land to serve as the new location for the home of Alexander Hamilton, commonly known as the Hamilton Grange, and to authorize the relocation of the Hamilton Grange to the acquired land	Pub. L. 106–482 (text) (PDF)
106-483	November 9, 2000	(No short title)	Recognizing that the Birmingham Pledge has made a significant contribution in fostering racial harmony and reconciliation in the United States and around the world, and for other purposes	Pub. L. 106–483 (text) (PDF)
106-484	November 9, 2000	Bring Them Home Alive Act of 2000	A bill to provide for the granting of refugee status in the United States to nationals of certain foreign countries in which American Vietnam War POW/MIAs or American Korean War POW/MIAs may be present, if those nationals assist in the return to the United States of those POW/MIAs alive; Bring Them Home Alive Act of 1999	Pub. L. 106–484 (text) (PDF)
106-485	November 9, 2000	(No short title)	An act to direct the Secretary of the Interior to convey certain land under the jurisdiction of the Bureau of Land Management in Washakie County and Big Horn County, Wyoming, to the Westside Irrigation District, Wyoming, and for other purposes	Pub. L. 106–485 (text) (PDF)
106-486	November 9, 2000	(No short title)	An act to review the suitability and feasibility of recovering costs of high altitude rescues at Denali National Park and Preserve in the State of Alaska, and for other purposes	Pub. L. 106–486 (text) (PDF)
106-487	November 9, 2000	Vicksburg Campaign Trail Battlefields Preservation Act of 2000	A bill to authorize the feasibility study on the preservation of certain Civil War battlefields along the Vicksburg Campaign Trail; Vicksburg Campaign Trail Battlefields Preservation Act of 1999	Pub. L. 106–487 (text) (PDF)
106-488	November 9, 2000	(No short title)	An act to improve Native hiring and contracting by the Federal Government within the State of Alaska, and for other purposes	Pub. L. 106–488 (text) (PDF)
106-489	November 9, 2000	(No short title)	An act to amend title 46, United States Code, to provide equitable treatment with respect to State and local income taxes for certain individuals who perform duties on vessels	Pub. L. 106–489 (text) (PDF)
106-490	November 9, 2000	(No short title)	An act to provide that the conveyance by the Bureau of Land Management of the surface estate to certain land in the State of Wyoming in exchange for certain private land will not result in the removal of the land from operation of the mining laws	Pub. L. 106–490 (text) (PDF)
106-491	November 9, 2000	(No short title)	An act to amend the Act which established the Saint-Gaudens Historic Site, in the State of New Hampshire, by modifying the boundary and for other purposes	Pub. L. 106–491 (text) (PDF)
106-492	November 9, 2000	National Law Enforcement Museum Act	A bill to establish the National Law Enforcement Museum on Federal land in the District of Columbia	Pub. L. 106–492 (text) (PDF)
106-493	November 9, 2000	(No short title)	An act to provide for equal exchanges of land around the Cascade Reservoir	Pub. L. 106–493 (text) (PDF)
106-494	November 9, 2000	(No short title)	An act to provide for the conveyance of certain land to Park County, Wyoming	Pub. L. 106–494 (text) (PDF)
106-495	November 9, 2000	(No short title)	An act to permit the conveyance of certain land in Powell, Wyoming	Pub. L. 106–495 (text) (PDF)
106-496	November 9, 2000	Bend Feed Canal Pipeline Project Act of 2000	A bill to authorize the Bureau of Reclamation to participate in the planning, design, and construction of the Bend Feed Canal Pipeline Project, Oregon, and for other purposes	Pub. L. 106–496 (text) (PDF)
106-497	November 9, 2000	Indian Arts and Crafts Enforcement Act of 2000	A bill to improve the cause of action for misrepresentation of Indian arts and crafts	Pub. L. 106–497 (text) (PDF)
106-498	November 9, 2000	Klamath Basin Water Supply Enhancement Act of 2000	A bill to authorize the Bureau of Reclamation to conduct certain feasibility studies to augment water supplies for the Klamath Project, Oregon and California, and for other purposes	Pub. L. 106–498 (text) (PDF)
106-499	November 9, 2000	(No short title)	An act to authorize the Secretary of the Interior to conduct a study to investigate opportunities to better manage the water resources in the Salmon Creek watershed of the upper Columbia River	Pub. L. 106–499 (text) (PDF)
106-500	November 9, 2000	(No short title)	An act to assist in the establishment of an interpretive center and museum in the vicinity of the Diamond Valley Lake in southern California to ensure the protection and interpretation of the paleontology discoveries made at the lake and to develop a trail system for the lake for use by pedestrians and nonmotorized vehicles	Pub. L. 106–500 (text) (PDF)
106-501	November 13, 2000	Older Americans Act Amendments of 2000	To amend the Older Americans Act of 1965 to authorize appropriations for fiscal years 2000 through 2003; Older American Community Service Employment Act; Older Americans Act Amendments of 1999; Older Americans Act of 1999; Older Americans Amendments of 1999; Older Americans Program Authorization bill	Pub. L. 106–501 (text) (PDF)
106-502	November 13, 2000	Fisheries Restoration and Irrigation Mitigation Act of 2000	A bill to authorize the Secretary of the Interior to establish a program to plan, design, and construct facilities to mitigate impacts associated with irrigation system water diversions by local governmental entities in the Pacific Ocean drainage of the States of Oregon, Washington, Montana, and Idaho; To authorize the Secretary of the Army to develop and implement projects for fish screens, fish passage devices, and other similar measures to mitigate adverse impacts associated with irrigation system water diversions by local governmental entities in the States of Oregon, Washington, Montana, and Idaho; To authorize the Secretary of the Interior to plan, design, and construct fish screens, fish passage devices, and related features to mitigate adverse impacts associated with irrigation system water diversions by local governmental entities in the States of Oregon, Washington, Montana, Idaho, and California; Irrigation Mitigation and Restoration Partnership Act of 1999; Irrigation Mitigation and Restoration Partnership Act of 2000	Pub. L. 106–502 (text) (PDF)
106-503	November 13, 2000	Fire Administration Authorization Act of 2000	To authorize appropriations for the United States Fire Administration for fiscal years 2000 and 2001, and for other purposes; Earthquake Hazards Reduction Authorization Act of 2000; Fire Administration Authorization Act of 1999	Pub. L. 106–503 (text) (PDF)
106-504	November 13, 2000	Guam Omnibus Opportunities Act	To amend the Organic Act of Guam, and for other purposes; Guam Foreign Direct Investment Equity Act; Guam Land Return Act	Pub. L. 106–504 (text) (PDF)
106-505	November 13, 2000	Public Health Improvement Act	To amend the Public Health Service Act to provide for recommendations of the Secretary of Health and Human Services regarding the placement of automatic external defibrillators in Federal buildings in order to improve survival rates of individuals who experience cardiac arrest in such buildings, and to establish protections from civil liability arising from the emergency use of the devices; Cardiac Arrest Survival Act of 1999; Cardiac Arrest Survival Act of 2000; Clinical Research Enhancement Act of 2000; Lupus Research and Care Amendments of 2000; Organ Procurement Organization Certification Act of 2000; Prostate Cancer Research and Prevention Act; Public Health Threats and Emergencies Act; Rural AED Act; Rural Access to Emergency Devices Act; Twenty-First Century Research Laboratories Act	Pub. L. 106–505 (text) (PDF)
106-506	November 13, 2000	Lake Tahoe Restoration Act	To promote environmental restoration around the Lake Tahoe basin	Pub. L. 106–506 (text) (PDF)
106-507	November 13, 2000	Twenty-First Century Research Laboratories Act	An act to provide for the posthumous promotion of William Clark of the Commonwealth of Virginia and the Commonwealth of Kentucky, co-leader of the Lewis and Clark Expedition, to the grade of captain in the Regular Army	Pub. L. 106–507 (text) (PDF)
106-508	November 13, 2000	Export Administration Modification and Clarification Act of 2000	To provide for increased penalties for violations of the Export Administration Act of 1979, and for other purposes	Pub. L. 106–508 (text) (PDF)
106-509	November 13, 2000	Ala Kahakai National Historic Trail Act	A bill to amend the National Trails System Act to designate the Ala Kahakai Trail as a National Historic Trail	Pub. L. 106–509 (text) (PDF)
106-510	November 13, 2000	Hawaii Volcanoes National Park Adjustment Act of 2000	A bill to eliminate restrictions on the acquisition of certain land contiguous to Hawaii Volcanoes National Park and for other purposes; Hawaii Volcanoes National Park Adjustment Act of 1999	Pub. L. 106–510 (text) (PDF)
106-511	November 13, 2000	Cheyenne River Sioux Tribe Equitable Compensation Act	A bill to provide for equitable compensation for the Cheyenne River Sioux Tribe, and for other purposes; Bosque Redondo Memorial Act; Richmond National Battlefield Park Act of 2000	Pub. L. 106–511 (text) (PDF)
106-512	November 13, 2000	Palmetto Bend Conveyance Act	A bill providing conveyance of the Palmetto Bend project to the State of Texas	Pub. L. 106–512 (text) (PDF)
106-513	November 13, 2000	National Marine Sanctuaries Amendments Act of 2000	A bill to amend the National Marine Sanctuaries Act, and for other purposes; National Marine Sanctuaries Amendments Act of 1999	Pub. L. 106–513 (text) (PDF)
106-514	November 13, 2000	Coastal Barrier Resources Reauthorization Act of 2000	A bill to reauthorize and amend the Coastal Barrier Resources Act; Coastal Barrier Resources Reauthorization Act of 1999	Pub. L. 106–514 (text) (PDF)
106-515	November 13, 2000	America's Law Enforcement and Mental Health Project	A bill to provide grants to establish demonstration mental health courts	Pub. L. 106–515 (text) (PDF)
106-516	November 13, 2000	Harriet Tubman Special Resource Study Act	A bill to direct the Secretary of the Interior to conduct a special resource study concerning the preservation and public use of sites associated with Harriet Tubman located in Auburn, New York, and for other purposes	Pub. L. 106–516 (text) (PDF)
106-517	November 13, 2000	Bulletproof Vest Partnership Grant Act of 2000	A bill to amend the Omnibus Crime Control and Safe Streets Act of 1968 to clarify the procedures and conditions for the award of matching grants for the purchase of armor vests	Pub. L. 106–517 (text) (PDF)
106-518	November 13, 2000	Federal Courts Improvement Act of 2000	A bill to make improvements in the operation and administration of the Federal courts, and for other purposes	Pub. L. 106–518 (text) (PDF)
106-519	November 15, 2000	FSC Repeal and Extraterritorial Income Exclusion Act of 2000	To amend the Internal Revenue Code of 1986 to repeal the provisions relating to foreign sales corporations (FSCs) and to exclude extraterritorial income from gross income; Foreign Sales Corporation Tax Act	Pub. L. 106–519 (text) (PDF)
106-520	November 15, 2000	Making further continuing appropriations for the fiscal year 2001, and for other purposes	Continuing Appropriation FY2001 (Sixteenth)	Pub. L. 106–520 (text) (PDF)
106-521	November 22, 2000	Coastal Barrier Resources Reauthorization Act of 1999	An act to authorize the enforcement by State and local governments of certain Federal Communications Commission regulations regarding use of citizens band radio equipment	Pub. L. 106–521 (text) (PDF)
106-522	November 22, 2000	District of Columbia Appropriations Act, 2001	Making appropriations for the government of the District of Columbia and other activities chargeable in whole or in part against the revenues of said District for the fiscal year ending September 30, 2001, and for other purposes	Pub. L. 106–522 (text) (PDF)
106-523	November 22, 2000	Military Extraterritorial Jurisdiction Act of 2000	A bill to establish court-martial jurisdiction over civilians serving with the Armed Forces during contingency operations, and to establish Federal jurisdiction over crimes committed outside the United States by former members of the Armed Forces and civilians accompanying the Armed Forces outside the United States; Military and Extraterritorial Jurisdiction Act of 1999	Pub. L. 106–523 (text) (PDF)
106-524	November 22, 2000	Military and Extraterritorial Jurisdiction Act of 1999	An act to revise the boundary of Fort Matanzas National Monument, and for other purposes	Pub. L. 106–524 (text) (PDF)
106-525	November 22, 2000	Minority Health and Health Disparities Research and Education Act of 2000	A bill to amend the Public Health Service Act to improve the health of minority individuals; Health Care Fairness Act of 1999	Pub. L. 106–525 (text) (PDF)
106-526	November 22, 2000	Bend Pine Nursery Land Conveyance Act	A bill to authorize the Secretary of Agriculture to sell or exchange all or part of certain administrative sites and other National Forest System land in the State of Oregon and use the proceeds derived from the sale or exchange for National Forest System purposes	Pub. L. 106–526 (text) (PDF)
106-527	November 22, 2000	Health Care Fairness Act of 1999	An act to adjust the boundary of the Natchez Trace Parkway, Mississippi, and for other purposes	Pub. L. 106–527 (text) (PDF)
106-528	November 22, 2000	Airport Security Improvement Act of 2000	A bill to amend title 49, United States Code, to improve airport security	Pub. L. 106–528 (text) (PDF)
106-529	November 22, 2000	Saint Croix Island Heritage Act	A bill to direct the Secretary of the Interior to provide assistance in planning and constructing a regional heritage center in Calais, Maine	Pub. L. 106–529 (text) (PDF)
106-530	November 22, 2000	Great Sand Dunes National Park and Preserve Act of 2000	A bill to provide for the establishment of the Great Sand Dunes National Park and Preserve and the Baca National Wildlife Refuge in the State of Colorado, and for other purposes; A bill to provide for the establishment of the Great Sand Dunes National Park and the Great Sand Dunes National Preserve in the State of Colorado, and for other purposes; Great Sand Dunes National Park Act of 2000	Pub. L. 106–530 (text) (PDF)
106-531	November 22, 2000	Reports Consolidation Act of 2000	A bill to amend chapter 35 of title 31, United States Code, to authorize the consolidation of certain financial and performance management reports required of Federal agencies, and for other purposes	Pub. L. 106–531 (text) (PDF)
106-532	November 22, 2000	Dairy Market Enhancement Act of 2000	A bill to amend the Agricultural Marketing Act of 1946 to enhance dairy markets through dairy product mandatory reporting, and for other purposes	Pub. L. 106–532 (text) (PDF)
106-533	November 22, 2000	Congressional Recognition for Excellence in Arts Education Act	A bill to amend the Congressional Award Act to establish a Congressional Recognition for Excellence in Arts Education Board	Pub. L. 106–533 (text) (PDF)
106-534	November 22, 2000	Protecting Seniors From Fraud Act	A bill to protect seniors from fraud	Pub. L. 106–534 (text) (PDF)
106-535	November 22, 2000	(No short title)	An act to designate the facility of the United States Postal Service located at 431 George Street in Millersville, Pennsylvania, as the "Robert S. Walker Post Office"	Pub. L. 106–535 (text) (PDF)
106-536	November 22, 2000	(No short title)	An act to amend the Immigration and Nationality Act to provide special immigrant status for certain United States international broadcasting employees	Pub. L. 106–536 (text) (PDF)
106-537	December 5, 2000	Making further continuing appropriations for the fiscal year 2001, and for other purposes	Continuing Appropriation FY2001 (Seventeenth)	Pub. L. 106–537 (text) (PDF)
106-538	December 6, 2000	Las Cienegas National Conservation Area Establishment Act of 1999	To establish the Las Cienegas National Conservation Area in the State of Arizona	Pub. L. 106–538 (text) (PDF)
106-539	December 7, 2000	Making further continuing appropriations for the fiscal year 2001, and for other purposes	Continuing Appropriation FY2001 (Eighteenth)	Pub. L. 106–539 (text) (PDF)
106-540	December 8, 2000	Making further continuing appropriations for the fiscal year 2001, and for other purposes	Continuing Appropriation FY2001 (Nineteenth)	Pub. L. 106–540 (text) (PDF)
106-541	December 11, 2000	Water Resources Development Act of 2000	A bill to provide for the conservation and development of water and related resources, to authorize the Secretary of the Army to construct various projects for improvements to rivers and harbors of the United States, and for other purposes; Charles M. Russell National Wildlife Refuge Enhancement Act of 2000; Dredged Material Reuse Act; Missouri River Protection and Improvement Act of 2000; Missouri River Restoration Act of 2000; Missouri River Valley Improvement Act; Everglades Restoration bill; Restoring the Everglades bill	Pub. L. 106–541 (text) (PDF)
106-542	December 11, 2000	Making further continuing appropriations for the fiscal year 2001, and for other purposes	Continuing Appropriation FY2001 (Twentieth)	Pub. L. 106–542 (text) (PDF)
106-543	December 15, 2000	Making further continuing appropriations for the fiscal year 2001, and for other purposes	Continuing Appropriation FY2001 (Twenty-first)	Pub. L. 106–543 (text) (PDF)
106-544	December 19, 2000	Presidential Threat Protection Act of 2000	To amend section 879 of title 18, United States Code, to provide clearer coverage over threats against former Presidents and members of their families, and for other purposes; Presidential Threat Protection Act of 1999	Pub. L. 106–544 (text) (PDF)
106-545	December 19, 2000	ICCVAM Authorization Act of 2000	To establish, wherever feasible, guidelines, recommendations, and regulations that promote the regulatory acceptance of new and revised toxicological tests that protect human and animal health and the environment while reducing, refining, or replacing animal tests and ensuring human safety and product effectiveness	Pub. L. 106–545 (text) (PDF)
106-546	December 19, 2000	DNA Analysis Backlog Elimination Act of 2000	To make grants to States for carrying out DNA analyses for use in the Combined DNA Index System of the Federal Bureau of Investigation, to provide for the collection and analysis of DNA samples from certain violent and sexual offenders for use in such system, and for other purposes	Pub. L. 106–546 (text) (PDF)
106-547	December 19, 2000	Enhanced Federal Security Act of 2000	To amend title 18, United States Code, to prevent the entry by false pretenses to any real property, vessel, or aircraft of the United States or secure area of any airport, to prevent the misuse of genuine and counterfeit police badges by those seeking to commit a crime, and for other purposes	Pub. L. 106–547 (text) (PDF)
106-548	December 19, 2000	Presidential Threat Protection Act of 1999	An act to direct the Secretary of Agriculture to convey to the town of Dolores, Colorado, the current site of the Joe Rowell Park	Pub. L. 106–548 (text) (PDF)
106-549	December 19, 2000	(No short title)	An act to authorize the Secretary of the Interior to contract with the Mancos Water Conservancy District to use the Mancos Project facilities for impounding, storage, diverting, and carriage of nonproject water for the purpose of irrigation, domestic, municipal, industrial, and any other beneficial purposes	Pub. L. 106–549 (text) (PDF)
106-550	December 19, 2000	James Madison Commemoration Commission Act	A bill to establish a commission to commemorate the 250th anniversary of the birth of James Madison	Pub. L. 106–550 (text) (PDF)
106-551	December 20, 2000	Chimpanzee Health Improvement, Maintenance, and Protection Act	To amend the Public Health Service Act to provide for a system of sanctuaries for chimpanzees that have been designated as being no longer needed in research conducted or supported by the Public Health Service, and for other purposes	Pub. L. 106–551 (text) (PDF)
106-552	December 20, 2000	(No short title)	An act to redesignate the facility of the United States Postal Service located at 514 Express Center Drive in Chicago, Illinois, as the "J. T. Weeker Service Center"	Pub. L. 106–552 (text) (PDF)
106-553	December 21, 2000	District of Columbia Appropriations Act, 2001	Making appropriations for the government of the District of Columbia and other activities chargeable in whole or in part against the revenues of said District for the fiscal year ending September 30, 2001, and for other purposes; Amy Boyer's Law; Department of Commerce and Related Agencies Appropriations Act, 2001; Department of Justice Appropriations Act, 2001; Department of State and Related Agency Appropriations Act, 2001; Departments of Commerce, Justice, and State, the Judiciary, and Related Agencies Appropriations Act, 2001; Judiciary Appropriations Act, 2001; LIFE Act; Launching Our Communities Access to Local Television Act of 2000; Legal Immigration Family Equity Act; Legal Immigration Family Equity bill	Pub. L. 106–553 (text) (PDF)
106-554	December 21, 2000	Consolidated Appropriations Act, 2001	Making appropriations for the Departments of Labor, Health and Human Services, and Education, and related agencies for the fiscal year ending September 30, 2001, and for other purposes; Advisory Council on Community Renewal Act; Assets for Independence Act Amendments of 2000; Certified Development Company Program Improvements Act of 2000; Children's Internet Protection Act; Children's Internet Protection Act; Colorado Ute Settlement Act Amendments of 2000; Commodity Futures Modernization Act of 2000; Community Renewal Tax Relief Act of 2000; Congressional Operations Appropriations Act, 2001; Dakota Water Resources Act of 2000; Delta Regional Authority Act of 2000; Department of Education Appropriations Act, 2001; Department of Health and Human Services Appropriations Act, 2001; Department of Labor Appropriations Act, 2001; Departments of Labor, Health and Human Services, and Education, and Related Agencies Appropriations Act, 2001; Departments of Labor, Health, and Human Services, and Education and Related Agencies Appropriations Act, 2001; Early Learning Opportunities Act; Erie Canalway National Heritage Cooridor Act; Executive Office Appropriations Act, 2001; Genetic Information Nondiscrimination in Health Insurance Act of 2000; HUBZones in Native America Act of 2000; Independent Agencies Appropriations Act, 2001; LIFE Act Amendments of 2000; Law Enforcement Pay Equity Act of 2000; Legal Certainty for Bank Products Act of 2000; Legislative Branch Appropriations Act, 2001; Literacy Involves Families Together Act; Medicare, Medicaid, and SCHIP Benefits Improvement and Protection Act of 2000; Miscellaneous Appropriations Act, 2001; National Women's Business Council Reauthorization Act of 2000; Neighborhood Children's Internet Protection Act; New Markets Venture Capital Program Act of 2000; Patient Safety and Errors Reduction Act; Patients' Bill of Rights Plus Act; Physical Education for Progress Act; Postal Service Appropriations Act, 2001; Rural Education Achievement Program; Small Business Innovation Research Program Reauthorization Act of 2000; Small Business Investment Corrections Act of 2000; Small Business Loan Improvement Act of 2000; Small Business Programs Reauthorization Act of 2000; Small Business Reauthorization Act of 2000; Social Security and Medicare Off-Budget Lockbox Act of 2000; Social Security and Medicare Safe Deposit Box Act of 2000; Treasury Department Appropriations Act, 2001; Treasury and General Government Appropriations Act, 2001; Vietnam Education Foundation Act of 2000; Women's Health and Cancer Rights Act of 2000; BIPA bill; Benefits Improvement and Protection Act; FY2001 Labor, Health and Human Services, and Education Appropriations bill	Pub. L. 106–554 (text) (PDF)
106-555	December 21, 2000	Striped Bass Conservation, Atlantic Coastal Fisheries Management, and Marine Mammal Rescue Assistance Act of 2000	To assist in the conservation of coral reefs; To reauthorize the Striped Bass Conservation Act, and for other purposes; Atlantic Coastal Fisheries Act of 2000; Coral Reef Conservation and Restoration Act of 1999; Marine Mammal Rescue Assistance Act of 2000	Pub. L. 106–555 (text) (PDF)
106-556	December 21, 2000	Marine Mammal Rescue Assistance Act of 2000	An act to designate the facility of the United States Postal Service located at 200 South George Street in York, Pennsylvania, as the "George Atlee Goodling Post Office Building"	Pub. L. 106–556 (text) (PDF)
106-557	December 21, 2000	Shark Finning Prohibition Act	To amend the Magnuson-Stevens Fishery Conservation and Management Act to eliminate the wasteful and unsportsmanlike practice of shark finning	Pub. L. 106–557 (text) (PDF)
106-558	December 21, 2000	(No short title)	An act to amend the National Forest and Public Lands of Nevada Enhancement Act of 1988 to adjust the boundary of the Toiyabe National Forest, Nevada, and to amend chapter 55 of title 5, United States Code, to authorize equal overtime pay provisions for all Federal employees engaged in wildland fire suppression operations	Pub. L. 106–558 (text) (PDF)
106-559	December 21, 2000	Indian Tribal Justice Technical and Legal Assistance Act of 2000	A bill to provide technical and legal assistance for tribal justice systems and members of Indian tribes, and for other purposes; Indian Tribal Justice Technical and Legal Assistance Act of 1999	Pub. L. 106–559 (text) (PDF)
106-560	December 21, 2000	Interstate Transportation of Dangerous Criminals Act of 2000	A bill to provide protection against the risks to the public that are inherent in the interstate transportation of violent prisoners; Interstate Transportation of Dangerous Criminals Act of 1999; Jeanna's Act	Pub. L. 106–560 (text) (PDF)
106-561	December 21, 2000	Paul Coverdell National Forensic Sciences Improvement Act of 2000	A bill to improve the quality, timeliness, and credibility of forensic science services for criminal justice purposes; A bill to improve the quality, timeliness, and credibility of forensic science services for criminal justice purposes, and for other purposes	Pub. L. 106–561 (text) (PDF)
106-562	December 23, 2000	Pribilof Islands Transition Act	An act to approve a governing international fishery agreement between the United States and the Russian Federation	Pub. L. 106–562 (text) (PDF)
106-563	December 23, 2000	Lincoln Highway Study Act of 2000	To require the Secretary of the Interior to undertake a study regarding methods to commemorate the national significance of the United States roadways that comprise the Lincoln Highway, and for other purposes; Lincoln Highway Study Act of 1999	Pub. L. 106–563 (text) (PDF)
106-564	December 23, 2000	Lincoln Highway Study Act of 1999	An act to establish a standard time zone for Guam and the Commonwealth of the Northern Mariana Islands, and for other purposes	Pub. L. 106–564 (text) (PDF)
106-565	December 23, 2000	Jamestown 400th Commemoration Commission Act of 2000	To establish the Jamestown 400th Commemoration Commission, and for other purposes	Pub. L. 106–565 (text) (PDF)
106-566	December 23, 2000	Hawaii Water Resources Act of 2000	A bill to direct the Secretary of the Interior to conduct a study on the reclamation and reuse of water and wastewater in the State of Hawaii; An Act to direct the Secretary of the Interior to conduct a study on the reclamation and reuse of water and wastewater in the State of Hawaii, and for other purposes; Clear Creek Distribution System Conveyance Act; Colusa Basin Watershed Integrated Resources Management Act; Dickinson Dam Bascule Gates Settlement Act of 2000; Hawaii Water Resources Act of 2000; Hawaii Water Resources Reclamation Act of 1999; Hawaii Water Resources Reclamation Act of 2000; Sugar Pine Dam and Reservoir Conveyance Act	Pub. L. 106–566 (text) (PDF)
106-567	December 27, 2000	Intelligence Authorization Act for Fiscal Year 2001	To authorize appropriations for fiscal year 2001 for intelligence and intelligence-related activities of the United States Government, the Community Management Account, and the Central Intelligence Agency Retirement and Disability System, and for other purposes; Counterintelligence Reform Act of 2000; Japanese Imperial Government Disclosure Act of 2000; National Security Agency Voluntary Separation Act; Public Interest Declassification Act of 2000; Intelligence Authorization bill, FY2001	Pub. L. 106–567 (text) (PDF)
106-568	December 27, 2000	Omnibus Indian Advancement Act	To authorize the construction of a Wakpa Sica Reconciliation Place in Fort Pierre, South Dakota, and for other purposes; American Indian Education Foundation Act of 2000; California Indian Land Transfer Act; Graton Rancherra Restoration Act; Hawaiian Homelands Homeownership Act of 2000; Indian Employment, Training, and Related Services Demonstration Act Amendments of 2000; Native American Laws Technical Corrections Act of 2000; Navajo Nation Trust Land Leasing Act of 2000; Santa Fe Indian School Act; Shawnee Tribe Status Act of 2000; Torres-Martinez Desert Cahuilla Indians Claims Settlement Act	Pub. L. 106–568 (text) (PDF)
106-569	December 27, 2000	American Homeownership and Economic Opportunity Act of 2000	To expand homeownership in the United States, and for other purposes; Affordable Housing for Seniors and Families Act; Federal Reporting Act of 2000; Financial Regulatory Relief and Economic Efficiency Act of 2000; Hawaiian Homelands Homeownership Act of 2000; Housing Affordability Barrier Removal Act of 2000; Manufactured Housing Improvement Act of 2000; Private Mortgage Insurance Technical Corrections and Clarification Act	Pub. L. 106–569 (text) (PDF)
106-570	December 27, 2000	Assistance for International Malaria Control Act	An Act to authorize additional assistance for international malaria control, and for other purposes; An original bill to authorize additional assistance for international malaria control, and to provide for coordination and consultation in providing assistance under the Foreign Assistance Act of 1961 with respect to malaria, HIV, and tuberculosis; International Malaria Control Act of 2000; Pacific Charter Commission Act of 2000; Paul D. Coverdell World Wise Schools Act of 2000; Rails to Resources Act of 2000; United States-Macau Policy Act of 2000	Pub. L. 106–570 (text) (PDF)
106-571	December 28, 2000	Federal Physicians Comparability Allowance Amendments of 2000	To amend title 5, United States Code, to provide that physicians comparability allowances be treated as part of basic pay for retirement purposes; Anti-Retroactive Taxation Act	Pub. L. 106–571 (text) (PDF)
106-572	December 28, 2000	Computer Crime Enforcement Act	To establish a grant program to assist State and local law enforcement in deterring, investigating, and prosecuting computer crimes	Pub. L. 106–572 (text) (PDF)
106-573	December 28, 2000	Installment Tax Correction Act of 2000	To repeal the modification of the installment method	Pub. L. 106–573 (text) (PDF)
106-574	December 28, 2000	Dillonwood Giant Sequoia Grove Park Expansion Act	To authorize an expansion of the boundaries of Sequoia National Park to include Dillonwood Giant Sequoia Grove	Pub. L. 106–574 (text) (PDF)
106-575	December 28, 2000	Anti-Retroactive Taxation Act	An act to authorize the Forest Service to convey certain lands in the Lake Tahoe Basin to the Washoe County School District for use as an elementary school site	Pub. L. 106–575 (text) (PDF)
106-576	December 28, 2000	Lower Rio Grande Valley Water Resources Conservation and Improvement Act of 2000	A bill to direct the Secretary of the Interior, through the Bureau of Reclamation, to conserve and enhance the water supplies of the Lower Rio Grande Valley; Lower Rio Grande Valley Water Resources Conservation and Improvement Act of 1999	Pub. L. 106–576 (text) (PDF)
106-577	December 28, 2000	California Trail Interpretive Act	A bill to establish the California Trail Interpretive Center in Elko, Nevada, to facilitate the interpretation of the history of development and use of trails in the setting of the western portion of the United States; An Act to establish the California Trail Interpretive Center in Elko, Nevada, to facilitate the interpretation of the history of development and use of trails in the settling of the western portion of the United States, and for other purposes; Education Land Grant Act	Pub. L. 106–577 (text) (PDF)
106-578	December 28, 2000	Internet False Identification Prevention Act of 2000	A bill to strengthen the enforcement of Federal statutes relating to false identification, and for other purposes	Pub. L. 106–578 (text) (PDF)
106-579	December 28, 2000	National Moment of Remembrance Act	A bill to establish the White House Commission on the National Moment of Remembrance, and for other purposes	Pub. L. 106–579 (text) (PDF)
106-580	December 29, 2000	National Institute of Biomedical Imaging and Bioengineering Establishment Act	To amend the Public Health Service Act to establish the National Institute of Biomedical Imaging and Engineering; National Institute of Biomedical Imaging and Engineering Establishment Act	Pub. L. 106–580 (text) (PDF)

== Private laws ==
Private law number (Linked to Wikisource)	Date of enactment	Official short title	Description	Citation
106-1	August 2, 1999	(No short title)	An act to direct the Secretary of the Interior to transfer to John R. and Margaret J. Lowe of Big Horn County, Wyoming, certain land so as to correct an error in the patent issued to their predecessors in interest	113 Stat. 1955
106-2	August 2, 1999	(No short title)	An act to direct the Secretary of the Interior to transfer to the personal representative of the estate of Fred Steffens of Big Horn County, Wyoming, certain land comprising the Steffens family property	113 Stat. 1956
106-3	Dec. 3, 1999	(No short title)	An Act for the Relief of Suchada Kwong	113 Stat. 1957
106-4	May 15, 2000	(No short title)	An act for the relief of Belinda McGregor	114 Stat. 3095
106-5	July 6, 2000	(No short title)	An act to deem the vessel M/V MIST COVE to be less than 100 gross tons, as measured under chapter 145 of title 46, United States Code	114 Stat. 3096
106-6	October 10, 2000	(No short title)	An act for the relief of Akal Security, Incorporated	114 Stat. 3097
106-7	October 13, 2000	(No short title)	An act for the relief of Kerantha Poole-Christian	114 Stat. 3098
106-8	November 7, 2000	(No short title)	An act for the relief of certain Persian Gulf evacuees	114 Stat. 3099
106-9	November 9, 2000	(No short title)	An act for the private relief of Ruth Hairston by waiver of a filing deadline for appeal from a ruling relating to her application for a survivor annuity	114 Stat. 3102
106-10	November 9, 2000	(No short title)	An act for the relief of Sepandan Farnia and Farbod Farnia	114 Stat. 3103
106-11	November 9, 2000	(No short title)	An act for the relief of Zohreh Farhang Ghahfarokhi	114 Stat. 3105
106-12	November 9, 2000	(No short title)	An act for the relief of Luis A. Leon-Molina, Ligia Padron, Juan Leon Padron, Rendy Leon Padron, Manuel Leon Padron, and Luis Leon Padron	114 Stat. 3106
106-13	November 9, 2000	(No short title)	An act for the relief of Saeed Rezai	114 Stat. 3107
106-14	November 22, 2000	(No short title)	An act for the relief of Wei Jingsheng	114 Stat. 3109
106-15	November 22, 2000	(No short title)	An act for the relief of Marina Khalina and her son, Albert Mifakhov	114 Stat. 3110
106-16	November 22, 2000	(No short title)	An act for the relief of Sergio Lozano, Faurico Lozano and Ana Lozano	114 Stat. 3111
106-17	November 22, 2000	(No short title)	An act for the relief of Francis Schochenmaier and Mary Hudson	114 Stat. 3113
106-18	November 22, 2000	(No short title)	An act for the relief of Mina Vahedi Notash	114 Stat. 3115
106-19	November 22, 2000	(No short title)	An act for the relief of Mrs. Elizabeth Eka Bassey, Emmanuel O. Paul Bassey, and Mary Idongesit Paul Bassey	114 Stat. 3117
106-20	November 22, 2000	(No short title)	An act for the relief of Jacqueline Salinas and her children Gabriela Salinas, Alejandro Salinas, and Omar Salinas	114 Stat. 3118
106-21	November 22, 2000	(No short title)	An act for the relief of Guy Taylor	114 Stat. 3119
106-22	November 22, 2000	(No short title)	An act for the relief of Tony Lara	114 Stat. 3121
106-23	November 22, 2000	(No short title)	An act for the relief of Malia Miller	114 Stat. 3123
106-24	November 22, 2000	(No short title)	An act for the Relief of Jose Guadalupe Tellez Pinales	114 Stat. 3125

== Treaties ==
No treaties have been enacted this Congress.

== See also ==
- List of United States federal legislation
- List of acts of the 105th United States Congress
- List of acts of the 107th United States Congress
