= Social effects of Hurricane Katrina =

Hurricane Katrina had many social effects, due the significant loss and disruption of lives it caused. The number of fatalities, direct and indirect, related to Katrina is 1,833 and over 400,000 people were left homeless. The hurricane left hundreds of thousands of people without access to their homes or jobs, it separated people from relatives, and caused both physical and mental distress on those who suffered through the storm and its aftermath, such as Post-traumatic stress disorder (PTSD).

== Emergency preparation ==
At the beginning of 2001, the Federal Emergency Management Agency (FEMA) detailed three unfortunate events that were considered more than probable to happen in the United States. These three included deadly earthquakes in and around San Francisco, an attack in New York City at the hands of a terror group, and a combined hurricane and levee failure in New Orleans. The latter of the three is what would become, four years later, the costliest natural disaster in United States history. This was not the first hurricane, however, that was of concern to local agencies—the ones who plan for and execute emergency evacuations, etc. Hurricane Georges, a Category 3 storm, started an evacuation in 1998 but missed downtown New Orleans after heading west several hours before expected landfall.

While New Orleans experiences many of the same issues that other coastal cities do in the face of a storm, it also holds its own unique characteristics. The city sits below sea level, at about two feet below sea level at any given place. The Mississippi River, in contrast, sits above sea level by the same difference. At the extremes, though, a part of the city can be ten to fifteen feet below sea level. After Hurricane Georges and Hurricane Floyd in 1999, these stressors created the need for increased drainage and a sustainable levee system.

The purpose of the levees on the eastern and western banks of the Mississippi River is to keep water out of the city when levels become high. The juxtaposition of this is that while they may keep water out, after surges and storms overcome the levees, the structures also play a strong role in keeping the water trapped in the city. Continuing years later, inspections on the levees of New Orleans and its various parts of town and parishes details how insufficient these levees are and continue to be. Inspections through the Army Corps of Engineers showed several issues with the levees in place. These issues include wall erosion, pounding water, settling/tilting of flood wall panels, and animal burrowing.

As the city began to grow, drainage and levees were not seen as “enough” when faced with the potential of endangering the 1.4 million persons who called the city their home. Planning for the need to evacuate the population that would be willing and able to evacuate in an emergency, officials implemented a highway contraflow system. With this, all major inbound roads would be flipped to provide extra lanes for outbound purposes. This method was used prior to Hurricane Katrina in nearby states, citing “mixed successes”.

== Displacement ==
On August 28, New Orleans Mayor Ray Nagin ordered a mandatory evacuation of the city, the first in its history. Most of the city's residents evacuated, but approximately 100,000–120,000 remained after the mandatory evacuation order. The Superdome was made available as a shelter for those who were not able to evacuate and did not have protection from the storm. On August 29, about 12,000 people sought shelter between the Superdome and other shelters provided by the Red Cross. The extreme flooding caused by the hurricane later caused an additional 18,000 residents seek shelter at the Superdome and about 20,000 to the New Orleans Convention Center, neither of which were adequately prepared for that high numbers of evacuees.

Two weeks after the storm, 75% of evacuees were staying within 250 miles of the homes they lived in prior to the storm and by September 30, 2005 – a month after the storm – evacuees were registered in all 50 states. After 10 months, only a quarter of residents in the areas of the city that had flooded had returned and the evacuees that had moved away from the city had relocated an average of 3.5 times. In total, it is estimated that over a million people were displaced by Hurricane Katrina.

In 2006, 200,000 people called New Orleans home, a significant drop from the population of nearly half a million before Katrina. Of the rest of those who were displaced, about 40% moved to Texas and the rest went farther to either New York, Ohio, or even California.

Prior to Hurricane Katrina, the New Orleans Housing Authority managed 7,200 subsidized housing units that were occupied by low income families. After the flooding approximately 3,000 units were identified as significantly damaged and would need to be demolished and rebuilt. Although 3,000 units were destroyed, only 1,829 units were rebuilt and of these less than half met the criteria for subsidized housing. This further increased rental prices in New Orleans and caused the waitlist for subsidized housing became so long that it eventually closed and further prevented many of the lower income families from being able to move back to New Orleans. Some architects question if all of the 3,000 properties really sustained damage significant enough to warrant demolition. It is possible that the city of New Orleans used Hurricane Katrina as an opportunity for disaster capitalism by replacing subsidized housing with new homes to be sold to private owners and not setting priority on building housing that would have helped displaced citizens to return home.

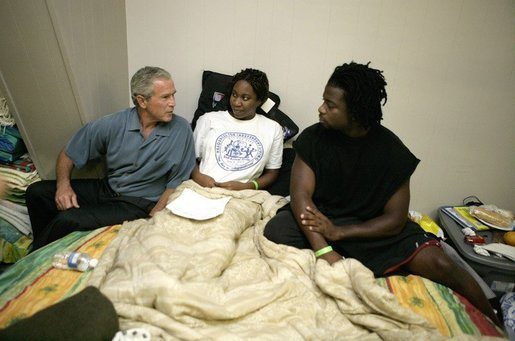
President George W. Bush visiting a family displaced by Hurricane Katrina during his September 5, 2005 visit to the U.S. Gulf Coast.

Many evacuees from New Orleans, facing months without income, severely damaged or destroyed homes, and little in the way of recoverable possessions, began expressing desires to permanently resettle elsewhere.

Some members of the National Guard also returned home from their deployments to Iraq, to no home, as they had been destroyed during Hurricane Katrina.

By July 2014, it was reported that nearly half of New Orleans neighborhoods had been restored back to over 90% of the residents from before Hurricane Katrina. Demographics of the city had shifted, with fewer African-American and white residents in the city now. This has allowed for a more diverse population with an increased number of Hispanic and Vietnamese residents after the storm. Of all age groups, children were the least likely to return to the city, decreasing the child population by 43%.

By August 2015, most of New Orleans had been restored; however, there were some areas, like the Lower Ninth Ward, that were still undergoing development. There were many open lots where homes used to be and many marsh wetlands with wrecked ships and shipping containers left in open fields. Artificial barrier islands and wetlands were built just south of New Orleans, with the belief that they will help protect the city from future storms that cause sea levels to rise. In 2017, to remember all of the victims of Hurricane Katrina, a memorial sculpture, called the Scrap House by artist Sally Heller, was built in the heart of New Orleans.

In terms of poverty, the rate 10 years after the hurricane was about the same prior to Katrina.

Due to the wide displacement caused by Hurricane Katrina, many people were separated from their family members, including young children separated from their parents and pets. A coordinated effort by the American Red Cross, Microsoft, and the San Diego Supercomputer Center, combined many diverse databases and has been very effective in reconnecting children with their parents. An effort to catalogue, identify, or even to collect remains of the dead is still ongoing as of April 2006, leaving those who do not know the whereabouts of loved ones to suffer uncertainty and anxiety. Over time both the reconnection and recovery operations have improved, but it will be much time before the majority of bodies are retrieved and people reunited.

While many existing organizations have worked to help those displaced, and some new groups and special efforts have been initiated, the survivors of Hurricane Katrina are still largely unorganized. Survivors have only recently begun to form associations for their own interests in the recovery effort. The largest of these associations is the ACORN Katrina Survivors Association, led by members New Orleans Association of Community Organizations for Reform Now (ACORN). The group has protested Federal Emergency Management Agency (FEMA) policies in both Houston, Texas, and Baton Rouge, Louisiana, and claims over 2,000 members.

An unknown, but significant, number of people restarted their lives in Houston instead of returning to New Orleans.

== Health issues ==
Aside from the lack of water, food, shelter, and sanitation facilities, there were concerns that the prolonged flooding might lead to an outbreak of health problems for those who remained in the hurricane-affected areas. In addition to dehydration and food poisoning, there was a potential for communicable disease outbreaks of Cholera and respiratory illness, all related to the growing contamination of food and drinking water supplies in the area.

President Bush declared an emergency for the entire Gulf Coast. Before the hurricane, government health officials prepared to respond, and the Centers for Disease Control and Prevention (CDC) began sending medical emergency supplies to locations near the worst-hit area within 48 hours after landfall.

Supplies shipped by CDC's Strategic National Stockpile provided pharmaceuticals, technical assistance teams, and treatment capacity for citizens otherwise stranded by the hurricane's catastrophic effect on hospital infrastructure in Louisiana and Mississippi. These supplies served an estimated 30 acute care hospitals south of Interstate Highway 10, and volunteers organized around its, "contingency stations," to become temporary stand-ins for hospitals, warehouses, and distribution facilities damaged by the storm. Alongside strong responses from state and local medical teams, CDC support remained crucial until normal infrastructure support began to return a week and a half later.

Within days after landfall, medical authorities established contingency treatment facilities for over 10,000 people, and plans to treat thousands more were developing. Partnerships with commercial medical suppliers, shipping companies, and support services companies insured that evolving medical needs could be met within days or even hours.

Several significant chemical spills caused panic around the danger floodwaters posed to human health. This included the Murphy Oil USA refinery spill, which spilled petroleum products throughout the St. Bernard Parish. Residents remained worried about long term health effects even following clean up efforts, as high levels of heavy metals were found in soil. People who suffered from allergies or lung disorders, such as asthma, faced health complications due to toxic mold and airborne irritants, especially as they faced difficulties obtaining asthma medication. People without preexisting conditions also struggled, with doctors seeing an increase in upper and lower respiratory system symptoms leading to what some health officials dubbed, "Katrina Cough". In Gulfport, Mississippi, several hundred tons of chicken and uncooked shrimp were washed out of their containers at the nearby harbor and could have contaminated the water table. On September 6, it was reported that Escherichia coli (E. coli) had been detected at unsafe levels in the waters that flooded New Orleans. The CDC reported on September 7 that five people had died of bacterial infection from drinking water contaminated with Vibrio vulnificus, a bacterium from the Gulf of Mexico.

Wide outbreaks of severe infectious diseases such as cholera and dysentery were not considered likely because such illnesses are not endemic in the United States.

=== FEMA Trailers ===
A row of FEMA trailers

In order to house displaced residents FEMA provided thousands of portable trailers as temporary housing. But by 2006 the agency had become aware of concerning levels of formaldehyde gas present inside them. The chemical is a known human carcinogen and elevated levels began causing health issues for some trailer residents. Symptoms related to the trailers included respiratory problems, nausea, eye irritation, nosebleeds, and asthma. In 2012 a class action lawsuit against the trailer manufacturers concluded with over 55,000 residents being eligible for a share of the $37.5 million settlement fund.

=== Mental health ===
Mental health issues were commonly experienced by residents affected by Hurricane Katrina, especially post-traumatic stress disorder (PTSD). Five to seven months after the hurricane, 20% of people who had evacuated had exhibited mild to moderate mental health issues, 11% had exhibited serious mental health issues, and 16% had been diagnosed with PTSD.

One year later, evacuees exhibiting serious mental health issues and being diagnosed with PTSD had increased to 14% and 20%, respectively, which was unusual compared to other natural disasters. Residents of New Orleans with chronic mental health disorders were negatively affected by Hurricane Katrina as well. Before the hurricane, there were 196 practicing psychiatrists in New Orleans; after the hurricane, only 22 of them returned to New Orleans. Hospital rooms available for mental health patients also decreased from 487 to 190 because of the storm.

In addition to the increased risk of PTSD, the citizens of New Orleans that had been displaced to Houston, TX endured their own set of unique challenges. The media often covered stories of the increase in crime rate in Houston and often attributed the spike in crime to the displaced citizens of New Orleans which caused some Houstonians to become angry and resentful toward the victims of Hurricane Katrina. This created a moral panic in Houston; a sociological concept that describes the effect of media stories onto its audience. Case studies comparing the crime rates in Houston before and after Hurricane Katrina revealed that there was not a significant increase in crime rate. This moral panic created an unfair stigma onto the victims of Hurricane Katrina and it is believed that this may have led to loss of employment opportunities, barriers in education, and additional psychological stress.

Many residents of Houston who had moved from New Orleans after Katrina experienced a sense of déjà vu in 2017 after Hurricane Harvey.

== Prisoner welfare ==
During Hurricane Katrina many prisoners faced dire conditions in the jails and prisons throughout Louisiana. Despite residents being encouraged to evacuate, Sheriff Marlin Gusman announced that all prisoners would remain where they were incarcerated.

Orleans Parish Prison is a county jail in 2005 held pre-trial detainees and prisoners serving short sentences for misdemeanours. At the time it was the eighth largest jail in the country. On the 28 of October 300 prisoners from St. Bernard Sheriff's Office Prison were evacuated to Orleans Parish Prison in preparation for Hurricane Katrina. Orleans Parish Prison lacked enough cells for these inmates, leading to prisoners being held in the gymnasium overnight. On the 29 August when Hurricane Katrina hit, all the generators failed at Orleans Parish Prison. The lack of power caused the electric cell doors to remain locked shut. At this point most staff had abandoned the jail to evacuate, leaving 600 prisoners locked in their cells with no access to water, food, or any form of ventilation. Prisoners were left in these conditions for four days with flood waters rising to chest level in the ground floor cells. Following evacuations that began on 30 September, 517 inmates were reported as missing. Officials claim no inmates died during Katrina or the following evacuation but this has been disputed by prisoners and guards.

Inmates were evacuated the nearby Interstate 10 Overpass by boats, where they were forced to wait in the sun for long periods of time where they suffered dehydration and heat exhaustion. They were eventually bussed out other prisons within Louisiana, with thousands of men being taken to Elayn Hunt Correctional Center. Once there, they were held in a fenced in field, with no separation based on offence. This meant prisoners arrested due to petty crimes were mixed in with convicted felons and multiple instances of violence broke out. Guards often failed to intervene and threw food over the fence at prisoners, causing further fighting to escalate.

Following Hurricane Katrina the criminal defence system in New Orleans was unable to function, due public defenders losing all revenue as a result of the storm. This led to thousands being trapped within the criminal system with no way to appear in court, as they lacked legal representation. Many inmates were held for months past their arranged release date and no criminal trials were held in New Orleans between September 2005 - June 2006, increasing the backlog. As a result, inmates began calling the extended hold times "Katrina time".

Many prisoners had hoped to file legal lawsuits over their treatment during Katrina but were prevented by a bill signed into law on 6 December 2005 by then Governor Kathleen Blanco. Louisiana R.S. 29:735(2) ruled that no prisoners in custody during Katrina or Hurricane Rita could pursue damages due to a late release date, unless the agency made no attempt to ascertain their release date or failed to release them from custody. One 2010 civil case, involving two men who were ultimately not charged with a crime, was ruled in their favour with Sheriff Gusman being charged with false imprisonment.

== Animal issues ==
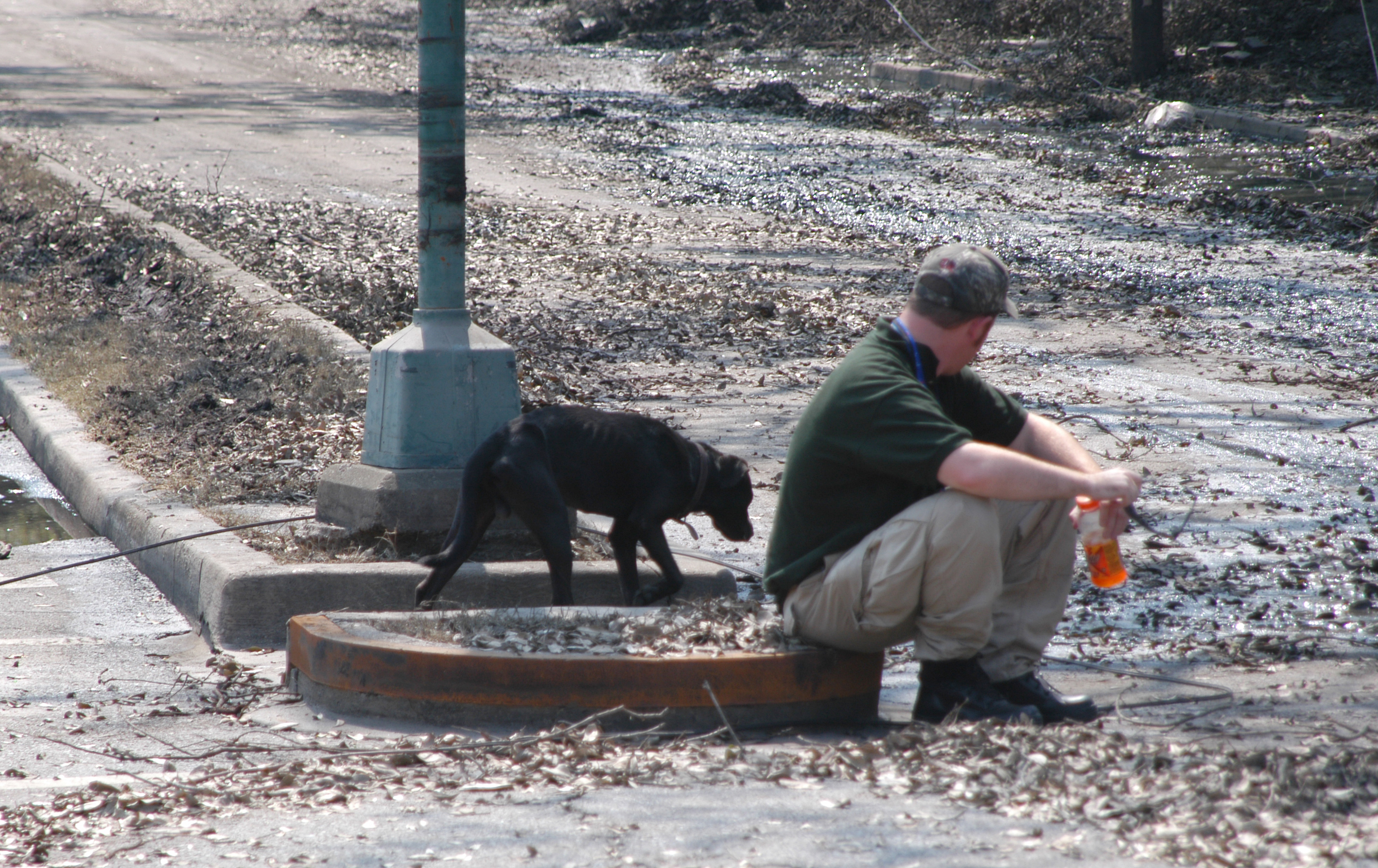
A stray dog abandoned by its owners approaches a rescue worker in New Orleans. Many animals were left by their owners who could not take them to the evacuation shelters.

In the aftermath of Hurricane Katrina, approximately 8,000 animals were rescued and brought to temporary shelters set up at the Lamar-Dixon Exposition Center in Gonzales, Louisiana, or the Parker Coliseum at Louisiana State University.

Most helicopter pilots and rescue boat captains refused to load pets in order to hold more people. Many families in the affected area refused to evacuate without their pets. While some field hospitals allowed pets to enter with their patients, those who were evacuated from the Superdome were not allowed to take their pets with them. St. Bernard Parish's sheriff's office came under scrutiny after more than 30 dogs were shot after residents were forced to abandon the animals in the Parish's schools. One owner told press that she had been forced at gunpoint by deputies to abandon her dog.

One case that attracted national attention was that of Snowball, a small white dog made famous by coverage of an Associated Press reporter, who said, "When a police officer confiscated a little boy's dog, the child cried until he vomited. 'Snowball, Snowball', he cried." The story of "Snowball" became a centerpiece in fundraising appeals by welfare organizations and various ad-hoc websites were created by people soliciting funds to help locate Snowball and reunite him with the boy.

Rescue teams were set up in the worst hit regions in response to desperate pleas from pet owners. Horses posed a particular problem, as they are easily stranded and cannot stand in water for long periods of time. Rescue agencies set up shelters and tried to find homes to adopt pets lost by their owners. Rescue centers were becoming overwhelmed in the days immediately following the hurricane. Several online resources were set up to give rescue groups, individuals, and businesses from around the country a centralized venue to publish their offers and requests for helping the animals displaced by Hurricane Katrina. Most of the 10,000 fish at the New Orleans Aquarium of the Americas died because the backup power ran out after four days. Most of the marine mammals and a large sea turtle survived. The Audubon Zoo lost only three animals out of a total of 1,400 due to good disaster planning and location on high ground.

The Humane Society of the United States (HSUS) in conjunction with the Louisiana SPCA and many other groups, had hundreds of staff and volunteers working in Louisiana and Mississippi. As of September 20, 2005, 6,031 animals were rescued and 400 were reunited with their owners. An estimated 600,000 animals were killed or left without shelter as a result of Hurricane Katrina. 250,000 of those were cats and dogs.

Inspired by the story of Snowball, US Representative Tom Lantos (D-California) introduced the Pets Evacuation and Transportation Standards Act to the House of Representatives which would require states seeking FEMA assistance to accommodate pets and service animals in their plans for evacuating residents facing disasters. The bill passed with an overwhelming majority on May 22, 2006.

== Baby names ==
Katrina also had a significant impact on the popularity of the name for babies. According to the Social Security Administration, Katrina, which had ranked as the 281st female baby name in 2004, dropped down to 382nd most popular name in 2006, 600th most popular name in 2007, and 815th most popular name in 2009. This surprised experts in naming trends, as past major hurricanes such as Hurricane Camille in 1969 had typically increased the popularity of a name due to its greater exposure.

== See also ==
- Criticism of the government response to Hurricane Katrina
- Danziger Bridge shootings
- Killing of Henry Glover
- Economic effects of Hurricane Katrina
- Media coverage of Hurricane Katrina
- Milvirtha Hendricks
- Political effects of Hurricane Katrina
