= 109th United States Congress =

2005-2007 U.S. legislative term

←	108th	110th	→
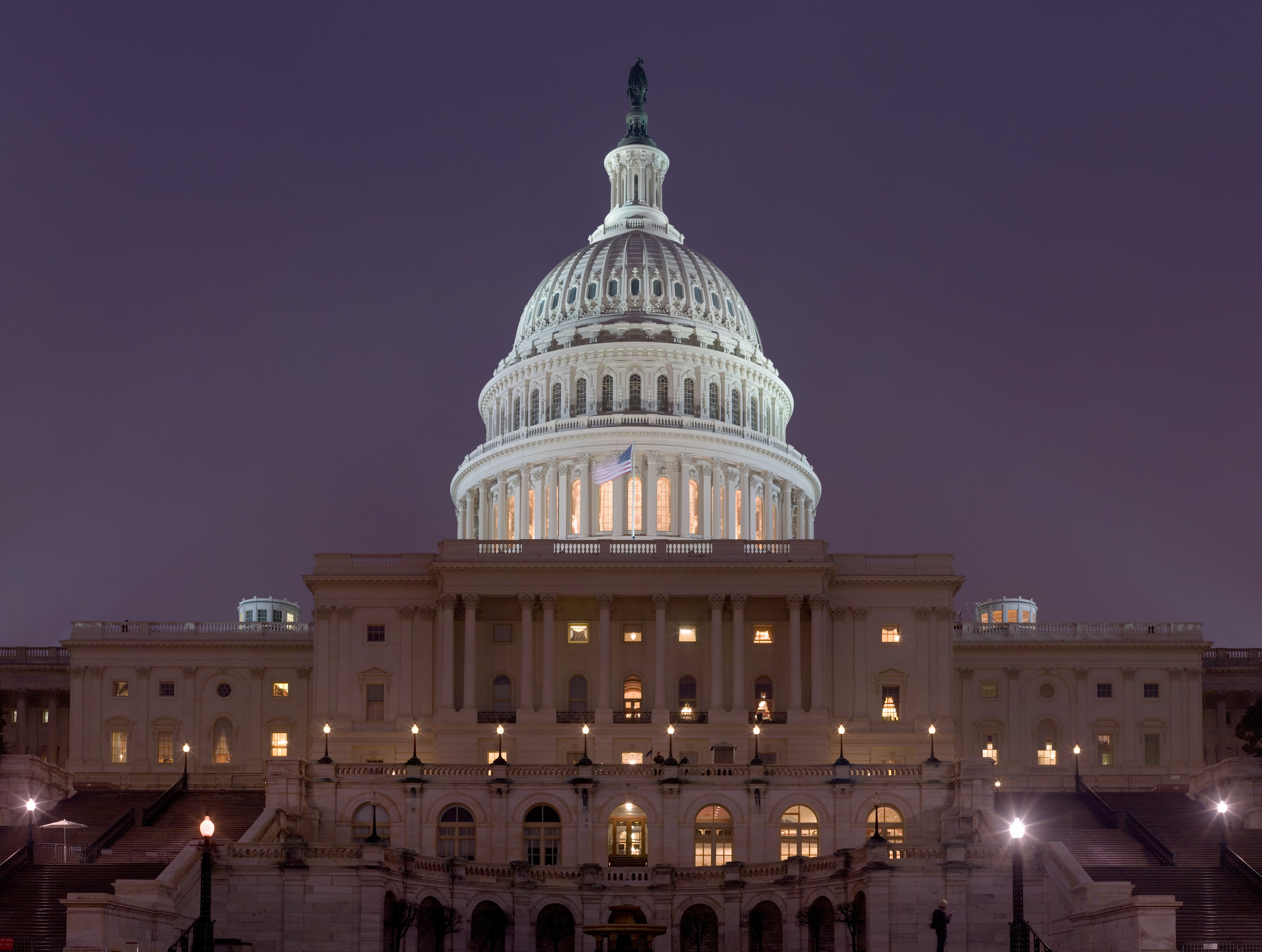
- United States Capitol (2006)

Overview
- Legislative body: United States Congress
- Jurisdiction: United States
- Term: January 3, 2005 – January 3, 2007

Senate
- Members: 100
- President: Dick Cheney (R)
- President pro tempore: Ted Stevens (R)
- Party control: Republican

House of Representatives
- Members: 435 representatives 5 non-voting delegates
- Speaker: Dennis Hastert (R)
- Party control: Republican

Sessions
- 1st: January 4, 2005 – December 22, 2005
- 2nd: January 3, 2006 – December 8, 2006

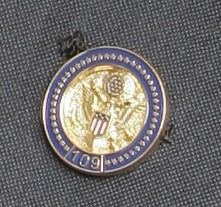
House of Representatives member pin for the 109th U.S. Congress

The 109th United States Congress was a meeting of the legislative branch of the United States federal government, composed of the United States Senate and the United States House of Representatives, from January 3, 2005, to January 3, 2007, during the fifth and sixth years of George W. Bush's presidency. House members were elected in the 2004 elections on November 2, 2004. Senators were elected in three classes in the 2000 elections on November 7, 2000, 2002 elections on November 5, 2002, or 2004 elections on November 2, 2004. The apportionment of seats in the House of Representatives was based on the 2000 United States census.

This is the most recent Congress to feature a Republican senator from Rhode Island, Lincoln Chafee, who lost re-election in 2006.

The Republicans maintained control of both the House and the Senate (slightly increasing their majority in both chambers), and with the reelection of President Bush, the Republicans maintained an overall federal government trifecta.

== Major events ==
- January 6, 2005: A joint session to count the presidential Electoral College votes of the 2004 presidential election.
- January 20, 2005 — President George W. Bush began his second term.
- November 7, 2006 — California Representative Nancy Pelosi and Nevada Senator Harry Reid led the Democratic Party in taking control of both the House and the Senate in the 2006 congressional elections, the first time in 12 years the Democrats secure control of both houses of Congress simultaneously.
- Prominent events included the filibuster "nuclear option" scare, the failure of the federal government to promptly respond to Hurricane Katrina disaster relief, the Tom DeLay corruption investigation, Plamegate, the rising unpopularity of the Iraq War, the 2006 immigration reform protests and government involvement in the Terri Schiavo case.
- In addition to the DeLay indictment, this Congress also had a number of scandals: Bob Ney, Randy "Duke" Cunningham, William J. Jefferson, Mark Foley scandal, and the Jack Abramoff scandals.
- This Congress met for 242 days, the fewest since World War II and 12 days fewer than the 80th Congress. As the Congress neared its conclusion, some media commentators labeled this the "Do Nothing Congress", a pejorative originally given to the 80th United States Congress by President Harry Truman, although the number of bills passed by Congress is no measure of its success.
- The President vetoed only one bill, his first veto, the Stem Cell Research Enhancement Act of 2005.

== Major legislation ==
=== Enacted ===
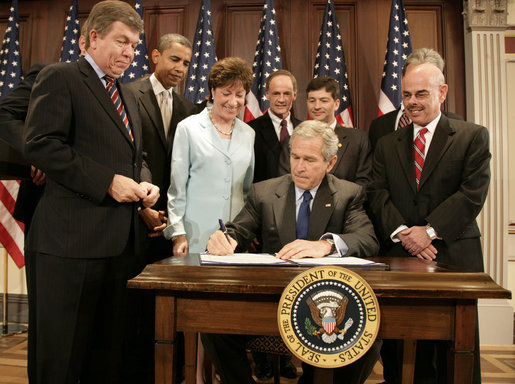
President George W. Bush signing the Federal Funding Accountability and Transparency Act of 2006 in the Eisenhower Executive Office Building, on September 26, 2006.

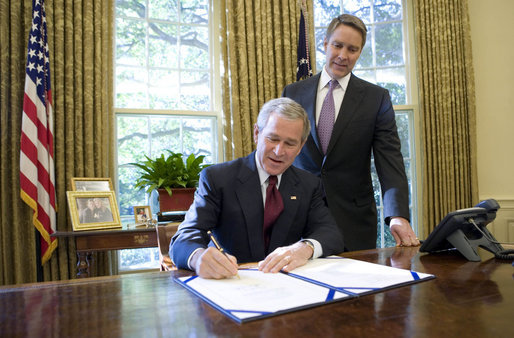
With Sen. Bill Frist (R-TN) looking on, President George W. Bush signs into law Pub. L. 109–353 (text) (PDF), the North Korea Nonproliferation Act of 2006, on October 13, 2006.

- February 17, 2005: Class Action Fairness Act of 2005, Pub. L. 109–2 (text) (PDF)
- March 21, 2005: Theresa Marie Schiavo's law, Pub. L. 109–3 (text) (PDF)
- April 20, 2005: Bankruptcy Abuse Prevention and Consumer Protection Act, Pub. L. 109–8 (text) (PDF)
- April 27, 2005: Family Entertainment and Copyright Act, Pub. L. 109–9 (text) (PDF)
- May 11, 2005: Real ID Act of 2005, Pub.L. 109-13
- July 9, 2005: Junk Fax Prevention Act of 2005, Pub.L. 109-21
- July 29, 2005: Patient Safety and Quality Improvement Act of 2005, Pub.L. 109-41
- August 2, 2005: Dominican Republic-Central America-United States Free Trade Agreement Implementation Act (CAFTA Implementation Act), Pub. L. 109–53 (text) (PDF)
- August 8, 2005: Energy Policy Act of 2005, Pub. L. 109–58 (text) (PDF)
- August 10, 2005: Transportation Equity Act of 2005, Pub. L. 109–59 (text) (PDF)
- October 26, 2005: Protection of Lawful Commerce in Arms Act, Pub. L. 109–92 (text) (PDF)
- December 1, 2005: Caribbean National Forest Act of 2005, Pub. L. 109–118 (text) (PDF)
- December 20, 2005: Stem Cell Therapeutic and Research Act of 2005, Pub.L. 109-129
- December 22, 2005: Presidential $1 Coin Act of 2005, Pub. L. 109–145 (text) (PDF)
- December 30, 2005: Department of Defense, Emergency Supplemental Appropriations to Address Hurricanes in the Gulf of Mexico, and Pandemic Influenza Act, 2006, Pub. L. 109–148 (text) (PDF)
- January 11, 2006: United States-Bahrain Free Trade Agreement Implementation Act, Pub.L. 109-169
- February 8, 2006: Deficit Reduction Act of 2005, Pub. L. 109–171 (text) (PDF)
- February 15, 2006: Federal Deposit Insurance Reform Act, Pub.L. 109-173
- March 8, 2006: USA PATRIOT Improvement and Reauthorization Act of 2006, Pub. L. 109–177 (text) (PDF)
- May 17, 2006: Tax Increase Prevention and Reconciliation Act of 2005, Pub. L. 109–222 (text) (PDF)
- May 29, 2006: Respect for America's Fallen Heroes Act, Pub. L. 109–228 (text) (PDF)
- June 15, 2006: Broadcast Decency Enforcement Act of 2005, Pub.L. 109-235
- July 24, 2006: Freedom to Display the American Flag Act of 2005, Pub.L. 109-243
- July 27, 2006: Fannie Lou Hamer, Rosa Parks, and Coretta Scott King Voting Rights Act Reauthorization and Amendments Act of 2006, Pub.L. 109-246
- July 27, 2006: Adam Walsh Child Protection and Safety Act, Pub. L. 109–248 (text) (PDF)
- August 17, 2006: Pension Protection Act of 2006, Pub.L. 109-280
- September 26, 2006: Federal Funding Accountability and Transparency Act of 2006, Pub. L. 109–282 (text) (PDF)
- September 26, 2006: United States-Oman Free Trade Agreement Implementation Act, Pub.L. 109-283
- September 29, 2006: Credit Rating Agency Reform Act, Pub.L. 109-291
- September 30, 2006: Iran Freedom and Support Act, Pub.L. 109-293
- October 4, 2006: Department of Homeland Security Appropriations Act, 2007, Pub.L. 109-295
- October 6, 2006: Pets Evacuation and Transportation Standards (PETS) Act of 2006, Pub.L. 109-308
- October 6, 2006: Trademark Dilution Revision Act, Pub.L. 109-312
- October 13, 2006: Darfur Peace and Accountability Act, Pub.L. 109-344
- October 13, 2006: Safe Port Act, Pub. L. 109–347 (text) (PDF), including title VIII, Unlawful Internet Gambling Enforcement Act of 2006
- October 17, 2006: John Warner National Defense Authorization Act for Fiscal Year 2007, Pub.L. 109-364
- October 17, 2006: Military Commissions Act of 2006, Pub. L. 109–366 (text) (PDF)
- October 26, 2006: Secure Fence Act of 2006, Pub. L. 109–367 (text) (PDF)
- November 27, 2006: Animal Enterprise Terrorism Act, Pub.L. 109-374
- December 14, 2006: Esther Martinez Native American Languages Preservation Act of 2006, Pub.L. 109-394
- December 19, 2006: Combating Autism Act of 2006, Pub.L. 109-416
- December 19, 2006: Pandemic and All Hazards Preparedness Act, Pub.L. 109-417
- December 20, 2006: Tax Relief and Health Act of 2006, Pub. L. 109–432 (text) (PDF)
- December 20, 2006: Postal Accountability and Enhancement Act, Pub. L. 109–435 (text) (PDF)
- December 20, 2006: Stolen Valor Act of 2005, Pub. L. 109–437 (text) (PDF)
- January 12, 2007: Johanna's Law, Pub.L. 109-475
- January 12, 2007: Telephone Records and Privacy Protection Act of 2006, Pub.L. 109-476

=== Proposed, but not enacted ===
- H.R. 554 — Personal Responsibility in Food Consumption Act
- H.R. 810 — Stem Cell Research Enhancement Act of 2005 (Vetoed)
- H.R. 1505 — Jessica Lunsford Act
- H.R. 4437 — Border Protection, Anti-terrorism and Illegal Immigration Control Act of 2005
- H.R. 4569 — Digital Transition Content Security Act
- S. 147 — Native Hawaiian Government Reorganization Act of 2005 (Akaka Bill)
- S. 2611 — Comprehensive Immigration Reform Act of 2006

More information: Complete index of Public and Private Laws for 109th Congress at U.S. Government Printing Office

== Hearings ==
- Congressional response to the NSA warrantless surveillance program (Senate Judiciary; House Intelligence; Democrats of the House Judiciary)

== Party summary ==
=== Senate ===
Party standings in the Senate throughout the 109th Congress 44 Democratic senators 55 Republican senators 1 Independent senator, caucusing with Democrats

The party summary for the Senate remained the same during the entire 109th Congress. On January 16, 2006, Democrat Jon Corzine resigned, but Democrat Bob Menendez was appointed and took Corzine's seat the next day.

	Party (shading shows control)			Total	Vacant
	Democratic (D)	Independent (I)	Republican (R)	Total	Vacant
End of previous congress	48	1	51	100	0
Begin	44	1	55	100	0
End	44	1	55	100	0
Final voting share	44.0%	1.0%	55.0%		
Beginning of next congress	49	2	49	100	0

=== House of Representatives ===
Due to resignations and special elections, Republicans lost a net of three seats; Democrats gained one seat; three seats were left vacant; and one seat which was vacant at the beginning of the Congress was filled. All seats were filled though special elections. (See Changes in membership, below.)

Affiliation	Party (Shading shows control)			Total	
Affiliation	Democratic	Independent	Republican	Total	Vacant
End of previous Congress	204	1	227	432	3
Begin	201	1	232	434	1
March 10, 2005	202	1	232	435	0
April 29, 2005	202	1	231	434	1
August 2, 2005	202	1	230	433	2
September 6, 2005	202	1	231	434	1
December 1, 2005	202	1	230	433	2
December 7, 2005	202	1	231	434	1
January 16, 2006	201	1	231	433	2
June 9, 2006	201	1	230	432	3
June 13, 2006	201	1	231	433	2
September 29, 2006	201	1	230	432	3
November 3, 2006	201	1	229	431	4
November 13, 2006	202	1	230	433	2
December 31, 2006	202	1	229	432	3
Final voting share	47.0%		53.0%		
Non-voting members	4	1	0	5	0
Beginning of next Congress	233	0	202	435	0

== Leadership ==
Section contents: Senate: Majority (R), Minority (D) • House: Majority (R), Minority (D)

=== Senate ===
Senate President

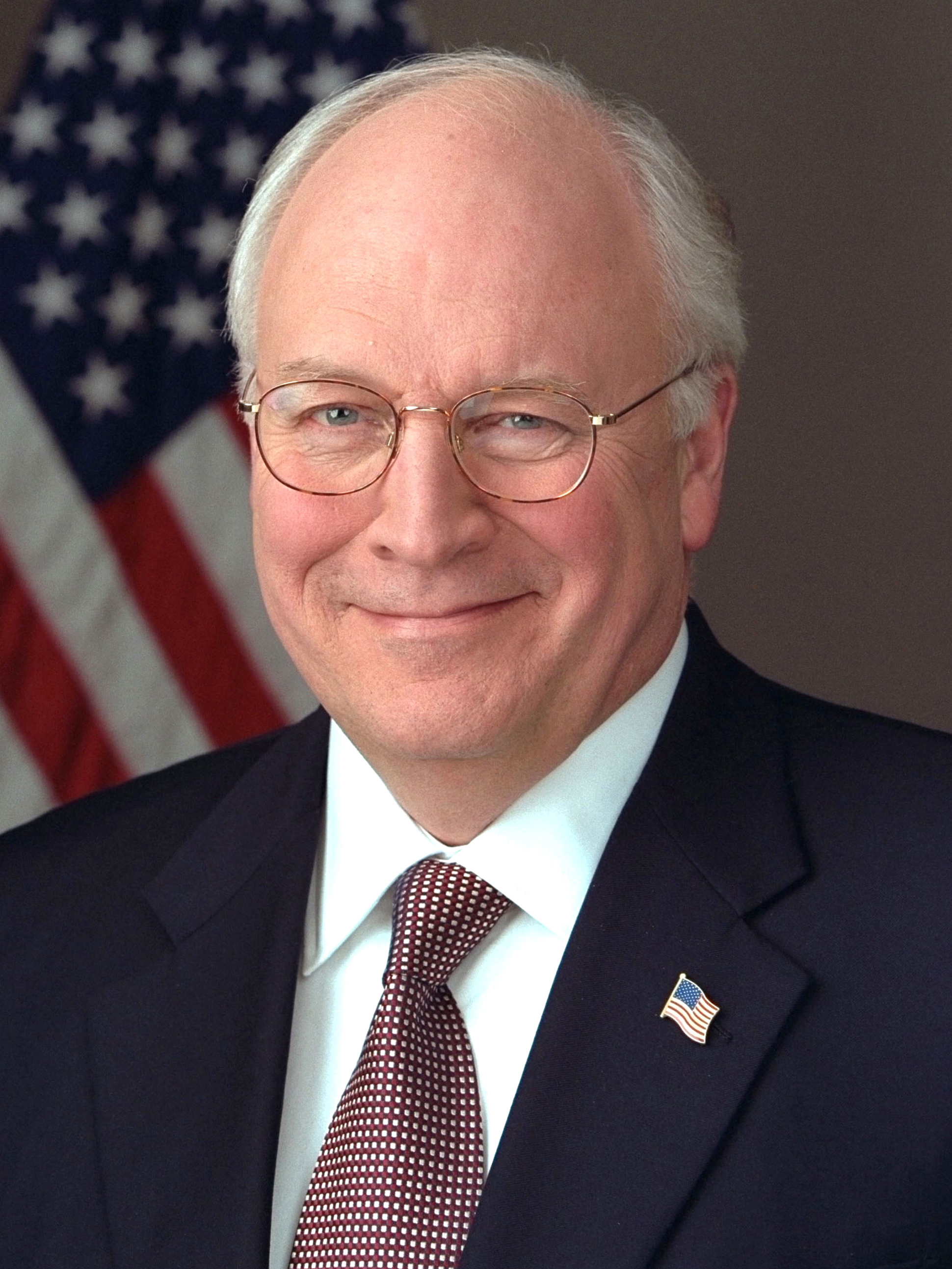
Dick Cheney (R)

Senate President pro tempore

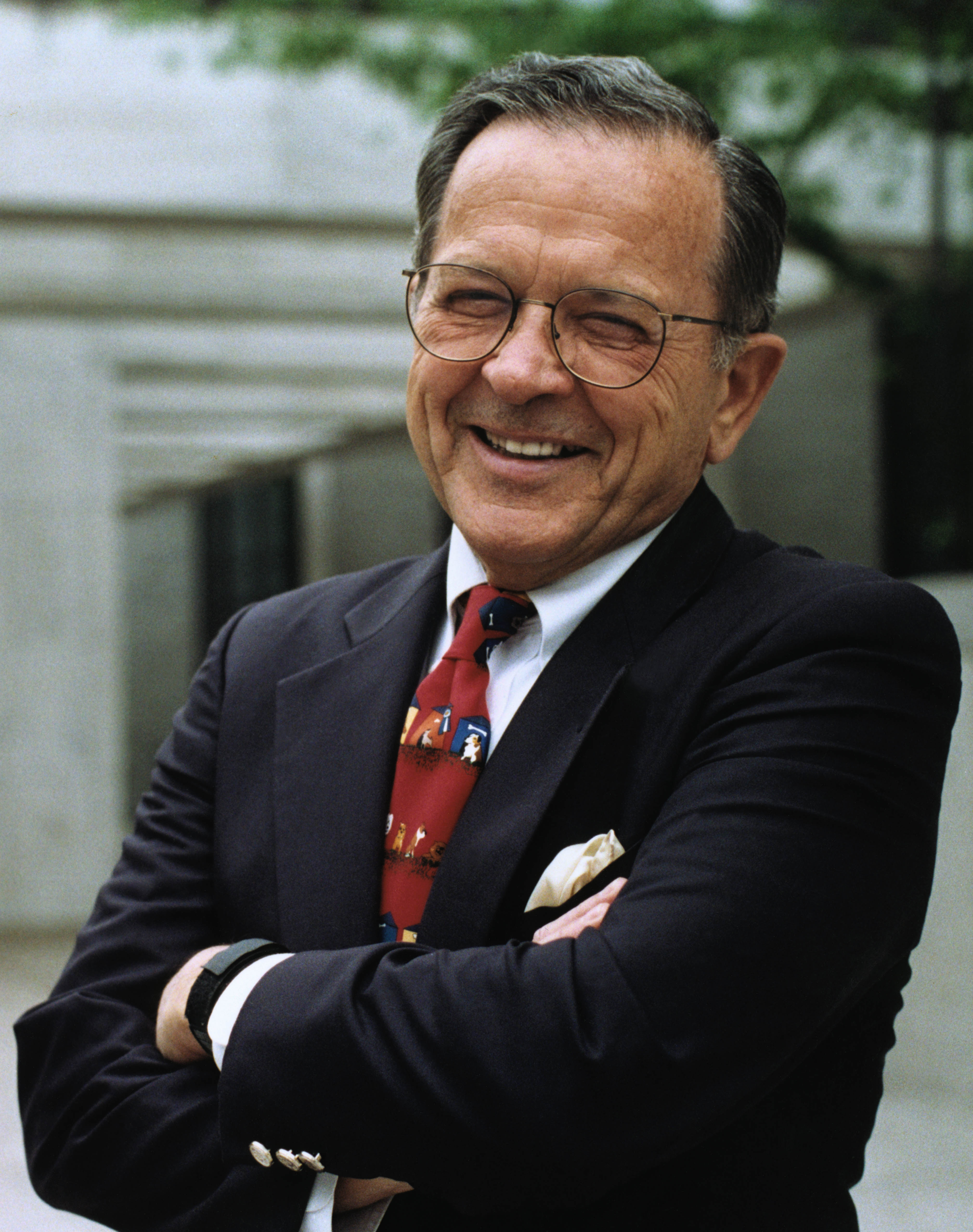
Ted Stevens (R)

- President: Dick Cheney (R)
- President pro tempore: Ted Stevens (R)

==== Majority (Republican) leadership ====
- Majority Leader: Bill Frist
- Majority Whip: Mitch McConnell
- Republican Conference Chairman: Rick Santorum
- Policy Committee Chairman: Jon Kyl
- Republican Conference Secretary: Kay Bailey Hutchison
- Republican Campaign Committee Chairwoman: Elizabeth Dole
- Chief Deputy Whip: Bob Bennett

==== Minority (Democratic) leadership ====
- Minority Leader: Harry Reid
- Minority Whip: Richard Durbin
- Democratic Conference Chairman: Harry Reid
- Policy Committee Chairman: Byron Dorgan
- Democratic Conference Secretary: Debbie Stabenow
- Democratic Campaign Committee Chairman: Chuck Schumer
- Steering and Outreach Committee Chair: Hillary Clinton
- Chief Deputy Whip: Barbara Boxer

=== House of Representatives ===
Speaker of the House

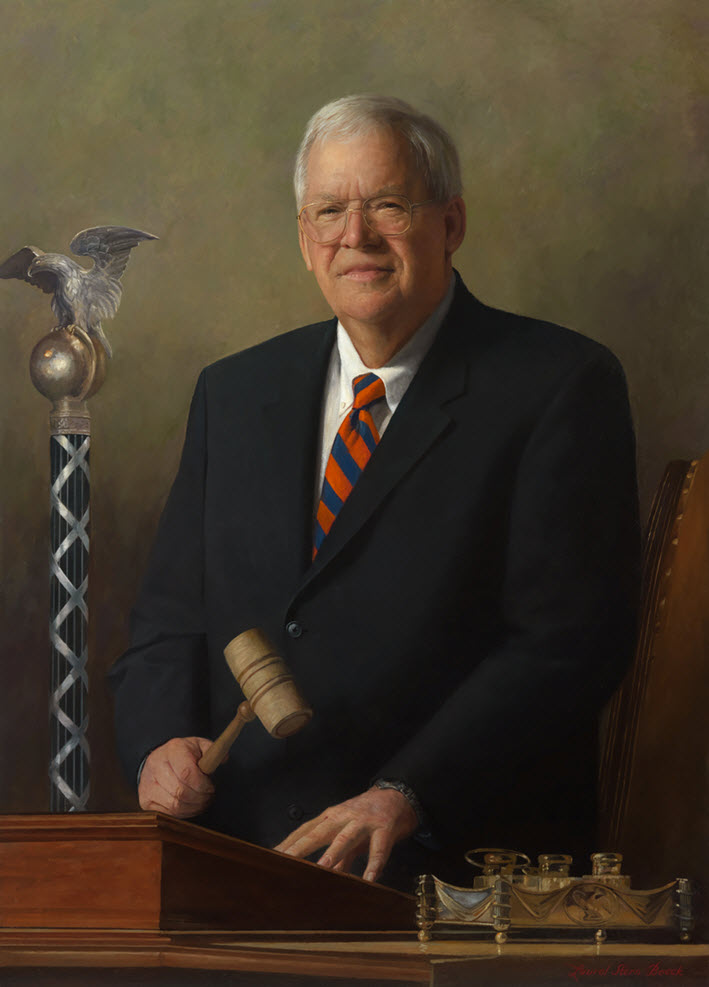
Dennis Hastert (R)

- Speaker: Dennis Hastert

==== Majority (Republican) leadership ====
- Majority Leader: Tom DeLay, until September 28, 2005
  - Roy Blunt, September 28, 2005 – February 2, 2006 ("Interim Leader")
  - John Boehner, from February 2, 2006
- Majority Whip: Roy Blunt
- Senior Chief Deputy Whip: Eric Cantor
- Deputy Whip Team: Kevin Brady
- Assistant Deputy Whip Team: Doc Hastings
- House Rules Committee Chairman: David Dreier
- Republican Conference Chairwoman: Deborah Pryce
- Republican Conference Vice-Chairman: Jack Kingston
- Republican Conference Secretary: John T. Doolittle
- Policy Committee Chairman: John Shadegg, until February 2, 2006
  - Adam Putnam, from February 2, 2006
- Republican Campaign Committee Chairman: Tom Reynolds

==== Minority (Democratic) leadership ====
- Minority Leader: Nancy Pelosi
- Minority Whip: Steny Hoyer
- Senior Chief Deputy Whip: John Lewis
- Minority Deputy Whip Team: Joe Crowley, Diana DeGette, Ron Kind, Ed Pastor, Jan Schakowsky, John Tanner & Maxine Waters
- Democratic Caucus Chairman: Bob Menendez, until January 16, 2006
  - Jim Clyburn, from January 16, 2006
- Democratic Caucus Vice Chairman: Jim Clyburn, until January 16, 2006
  - John Larson, from January 16, 2006
- Assistant to the House Minority Leader: John Spratt
- Democratic Campaign Committee Chairman: Rahm Emanuel
- Steering Committee Co-Chairs: Rosa DeLauro, George Miller

== Members ==
=== Senate ===
In this Congress, Class 1 meant their term ended with this Congress, requiring reelection in 2006; Class 2 meant their term began in the last Congress, requiring reelection in 2008; and Class 3 meant their term began in this Congress, requiring reelection in 2010.

==== Alabama ====
▌2. Jeff Sessions (R)
▌3. Richard Shelby (R)

==== Alaska ====
▌2. Ted Stevens (R)
▌3. Lisa Murkowski (R)

==== Arizona ====
▌1. Jon Kyl (R)
▌3. John McCain (R)

==== Arkansas ====
▌2. Mark Pryor (D)
▌3. Blanche Lincoln (D)

==== California ====
▌1. Dianne Feinstein (D)
▌3. Barbara Boxer (D)

==== Colorado ====
▌2. Wayne Allard (R)
▌3. Ken Salazar (D)

==== Connecticut ====
▌1. Joseph Lieberman (D)
▌3. Christopher Dodd (D)

==== Delaware ====
▌1. Tom Carper (D)
▌2. Joe Biden (D)

==== Florida ====
▌1. Bill Nelson (D)
▌3. Mel Martinez (R)

==== Georgia ====
▌2. Saxby Chambliss (R)
▌3. Johnny Isakson (R)

==== Hawaii ====
▌1. Daniel Akaka (D)
▌3. Daniel Inouye (D)

==== Idaho ====
▌2. Larry Craig (R)
▌3. Mike Crapo (R)

==== Illinois ====
▌2. Dick Durbin (D)
▌3. Barack Obama (D)

==== Indiana ====
▌1. Richard Lugar (R)
▌3. Evan Bayh (D)

==== Iowa ====
▌2. Tom Harkin (D)
▌3. Chuck Grassley (R)

==== Kansas ====
▌2. Pat Roberts (R)
▌3. Sam Brownback (R)

==== Kentucky ====
▌2. Mitch McConnell (R)
▌3. Jim Bunning (R)

==== Louisiana ====
▌2. Mary Landrieu (D)
▌3. David Vitter (R)

==== Maine ====
▌1. Olympia Snowe (R)
▌2. Susan Collins (R)

==== Maryland ====
▌1. Paul Sarbanes (D)
▌3. Barbara Mikulski (D)

==== Massachusetts ====
▌1. Ted Kennedy (D)
▌2. John Kerry (D)

==== Michigan ====
▌1. Debbie Stabenow (D)
▌2. Carl Levin (D)

==== Minnesota ====
▌1. Mark Dayton (DFL)
▌2. Norm Coleman (R)

==== Mississippi ====
▌1. Trent Lott (R)
▌2. Thad Cochran (R)

==== Missouri ====
▌1. James Talent (R)
▌3. Kit Bond (R)

==== Montana ====
▌1. Conrad Burns (R)
▌2. Max Baucus (D)

==== Nebraska ====
▌1. Ben Nelson (D)
▌2. Chuck Hagel (R)

==== Nevada ====
▌1. John Ensign (R)
▌3. Harry Reid (D)

==== New Hampshire ====
▌2. John E. Sununu (R)
▌3. Judd Gregg (R)

==== New Jersey ====
▌1. Jon Corzine (D), until January 17, 2006

▌Bob Menendez (D), from January 18, 2006

▌2. Frank Lautenberg (D)

==== New Mexico ====
▌1. Jeff Bingaman (D)
▌2. Pete Domenici (R)

==== New York ====
▌1. Hillary Clinton (D)
▌3. Chuck Schumer (D)

==== North Carolina ====
▌2. Elizabeth Dole (R)
▌3. Richard Burr (R)

==== North Dakota ====
▌1. Kent Conrad (D-NPL)
▌3. Byron Dorgan (D-NPL)

==== Ohio ====
▌1. Mike DeWine (R)
▌3. George Voinovich (R)

==== Oklahoma ====
▌2. James Inhofe (R)
▌3. Tom Coburn (R)

==== Oregon ====
▌2. Gordon Smith (R)
▌3. Ron Wyden (D)

==== Pennsylvania ====
▌1. Rick Santorum (R)
▌3. Arlen Specter (R)

==== Rhode Island ====
▌1. Lincoln Chafee (R)
▌2. Jack Reed (D)

==== South Carolina ====
▌2. Lindsey Graham (R)
▌3. Jim DeMint (R)

==== South Dakota ====
▌2. Tim Johnson (D)
▌3. John Thune (R)

==== Tennessee ====
▌1. Bill Frist (R)
▌2. Lamar Alexander (R)

==== Texas ====
▌1. Kay Bailey Hutchison (R)
▌2. John Cornyn (R)

==== Utah ====
▌1. Orrin Hatch (R)
▌3. Robert Bennett (R)

==== Vermont ====
▌1. Jim Jeffords (I)
▌3. Patrick Leahy (D)

==== Virginia ====
▌1. George Allen (R)
▌2. John Warner (R)

==== Washington ====
▌1. Maria Cantwell (D)
▌3. Patty Murray (D)

==== West Virginia ====
▌1. Robert Byrd (D)
▌2. Jay Rockefeller (D)

==== Wisconsin ====
▌1. Herb Kohl (D)
▌3. Russ Feingold (D)

==== Wyoming ====
▌1. Craig Thomas (R)
▌2. Mike Enzi (R)

Senators' party membership by state at the opening of the 109th Congress in January 2005 2 Democrats 1 Democrat and 1 Republican 2 Republicans 1 Independent and 1 Democrat

Senate majority leadership

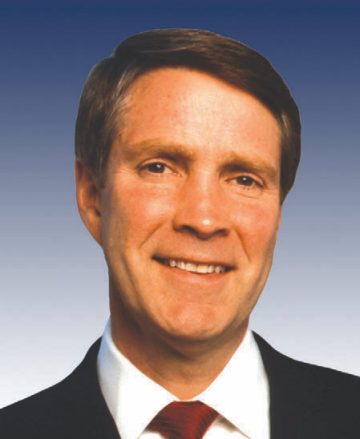
Republican leader
Bill Frist

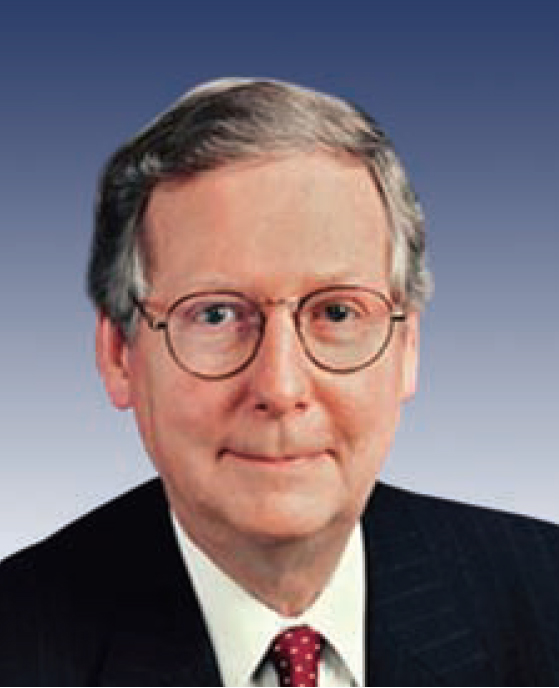
Republican whip
Mitch McConnell

Senate minority leadership

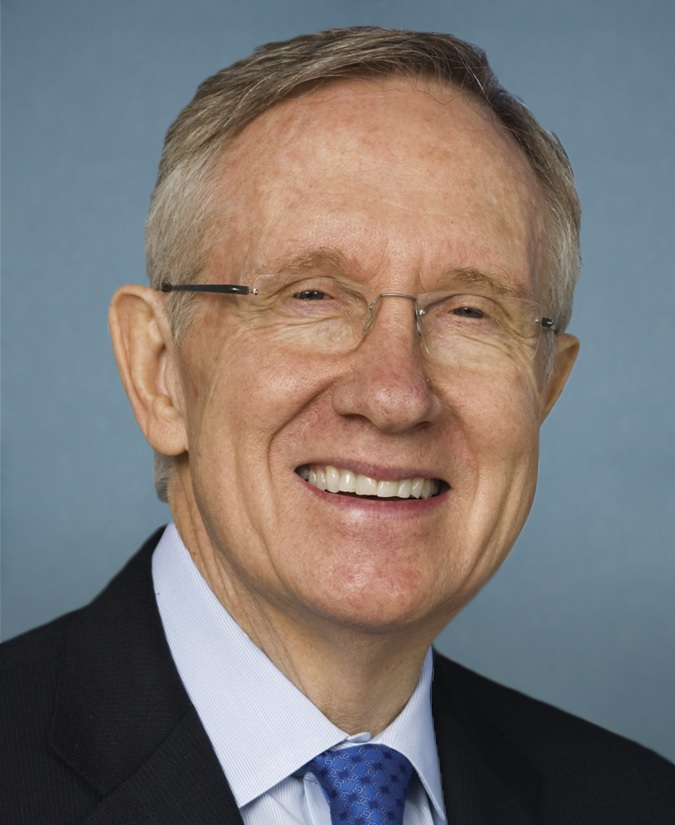
Democratic leader
Harry Reid

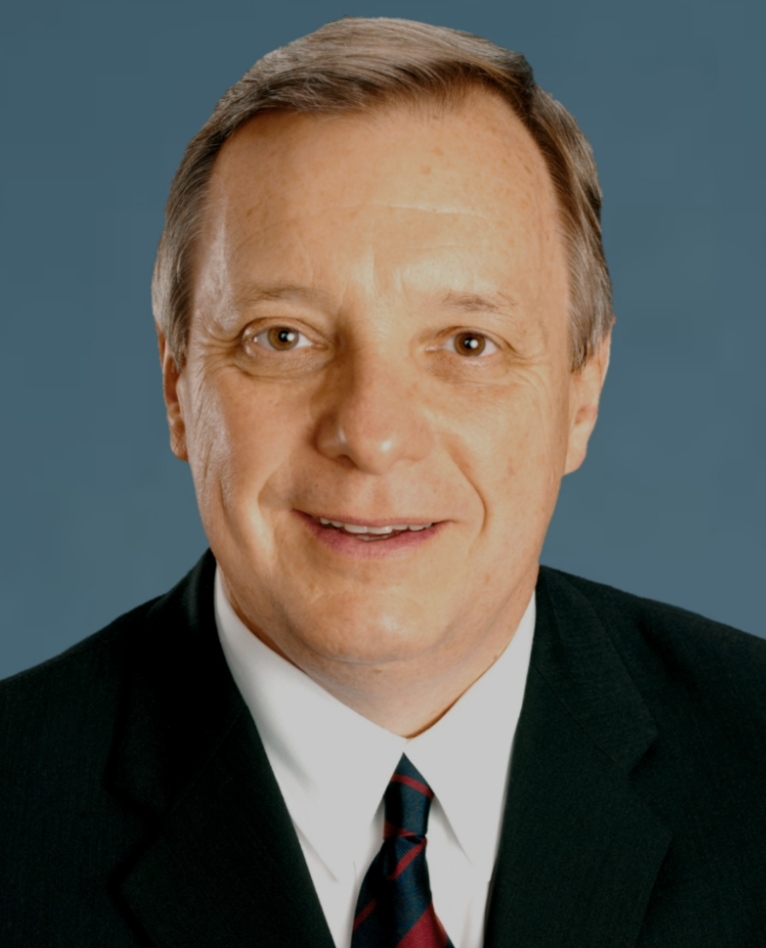
Democratic whip
Dick Durbin

=== House of Representatives ===
The names of members of the House of Representatives are preceded by their district numbers.

==== Alabama ====
▌1. Jo Bonner (R)
▌2. Terry Everett (R)
▌3. Mike D. Rogers (R)
▌4. Robert Aderholt (R)
▌5. Bud Cramer (D)
▌6. Spencer Bachus (R)
▌7. Artur Davis (D)

==== Alaska ====
▌At-large. Don Young (R)

==== Arizona ====
▌1. Rick Renzi (R)
▌2. Trent Franks (R)
▌3. John Shadegg (R)
▌4. Ed Pastor (D)
▌5. J.D. Hayworth (R)
▌6. Jeff Flake (R)
▌7. Raúl Grijalva (D)
▌8. Jim Kolbe (R)

==== Arkansas ====
▌1. Marion Berry (D)
▌2. Vic Snyder (D)
▌3. John Boozman (R)
▌4. Mike Ross (D)

==== California ====
▌1. Mike Thompson (D)
▌2. Wally Herger (R)
▌3. Dan Lungren (R)
▌4. John Doolittle (R)
5. Vacant, until March 9, 2005

▌Doris Matsui (D), from March 10, 2005

▌6. Lynn Woolsey (D)
▌7. George Miller (D)
▌8. Nancy Pelosi (D)
▌9. Barbara Lee (D)
▌10. Ellen Tauscher (D)
▌11. Richard Pombo (R)
▌12. Tom Lantos (D)
▌13. Pete Stark (D)
▌14. Anna Eshoo (D)
▌15. Mike Honda (D)
▌16. Zoe Lofgren (D)
▌17. Sam Farr (D)
▌18. Dennis Cardoza (D)
▌19. George Radanovich (R)
▌20. Jim Costa (D)
▌21. Devin Nunes (R)
▌22. Bill Thomas (R)
▌23. Lois Capps (D)
▌24. Elton Gallegly (R)
▌25. Howard McKeon (R)
▌26. David Dreier (R)
▌27. Brad Sherman (D)
▌28. Howard Berman (D)
▌29. Adam Schiff (D)
▌30. Henry Waxman (D)
▌31. Xavier Becerra (D)
▌32. Hilda Solis (D)
▌33. Diane Watson (D)
▌34. Lucille Roybal-Allard (D)
▌35. Maxine Waters (D)
▌36. Jane Harman (D)
▌37. Juanita Millender-McDonald (D)
▌38. Grace Napolitano (D)
▌39. Linda Sánchez (D)
▌40. Edward R. Royce (R)
▌41. Jerry Lewis (R)
▌42. Gary Miller (R)
▌43. Joe Baca (D)
▌44. Ken Calvert (R)
▌45. Mary Bono (R)
▌46. Dana Rohrabacher (R)
▌47. Loretta Sanchez (D)
▌48. Christopher Cox (R) until August 2, 2005

▌John Campbell (R) from December 7, 2005

▌49. Darrell Issa (R)
▌50. Randy "Duke" Cunningham (R) until December 1, 2005

▌Brian Bilbray (R) from June 13, 2006

▌51. Bob Filner (D)
▌52. Duncan Hunter (R)
▌53. Susan Davis (D)

==== Colorado ====
▌1. Diana DeGette (D)
▌2. Mark Udall (D)
▌3. John Salazar (D)
▌4. Marilyn Musgrave (R)
▌5. Joel Hefley (R)
▌6. Tom Tancredo (R)
▌7. Bob Beauprez (R)

==== Connecticut ====
▌1. John Larson (D)
▌2. Rob Simmons (R)
▌3. Rosa DeLauro (D)
▌4. Chris Shays (R)
▌5. Nancy Johnson (R)

==== Delaware ====
▌At-large. Mike Castle (R)

==== Florida ====
▌1. Jeff Miller (R)
▌2. Allen Boyd (D)
▌3. Corrine Brown (D)
▌4. Ander Crenshaw (R)
▌5. Ginny Brown-Waite (R)
▌6. Cliff Stearns (R)
▌7. John Mica (R)
▌8. Ric Keller (R)
▌9. Michael Bilirakis (R)
▌10. Bill Young (R)
▌11. Jim Davis (D)
▌12. Adam Putnam (R)
▌13. Katherine Harris (R)
▌14. Connie Mack IV (R)
▌15. Dave Weldon (R)
▌16. Mark Foley (R), until September 29, 2006, vacant thereafter
▌17. Kendrick Meek (D)
▌18. Ileana Ros-Lehtinen (R)
▌19. Robert Wexler (D)
▌20. Debbie Wasserman Schultz (D)
▌21. Lincoln Diaz-Balart (R)
▌22. Clay Shaw (R)
▌23. Alcee Hastings (D)
▌24. Tom Feeney (R)
▌25. Mario Diaz-Balart (R)

==== Georgia ====
▌1. Jack Kingston (R)
▌2. Sanford Bishop (D)
▌3. Jim Marshall (D)
▌4. Cynthia McKinney (D)
▌5. John Lewis (D)
▌6. Tom Price (R)
▌7. John Linder (R)
▌8. Lynn Westmoreland (R)
▌9. Charlie Norwood (R)
▌10. Nathan Deal (R)
▌11. Phil Gingrey (R)
▌12. John Barrow (D)
▌13. David Scott (D)

==== Hawaii ====
▌1. Neil Abercrombie (D)
▌2. Ed Case (D)

==== Idaho ====
▌1. C. L. Otter (R)
▌2. Michael K. Simpson (R)

==== Illinois ====
▌1. Bobby Rush (D)
▌2. Jesse Jackson Jr. (D)
▌3. Dan Lipinski (D)
▌4. Luis Gutiérrez (D)
▌5. Rahm Emanuel (D)
▌6. Henry Hyde (R)
▌7. Danny K. Davis (D)
▌8. Melissa Bean (D)
▌9. Janice D. Schakowsky (D)
▌10. Mark Steven Kirk (R)
▌11. Jerry Weller (R)
▌12. Jerry Costello (D)
▌13. Judy Biggert (R)
▌14. Dennis Hastert (R)
▌15. Timothy V. Johnson (R)
▌16. Donald Manzullo (R)
▌17. Lane Evans (D)
▌18. Ray LaHood (R)
▌19. John Shimkus (R)

==== Indiana ====
▌1. Pete Visclosky (D)
▌2. Chris Chocola (R)
▌3. Mark Souder (R)
▌4. Steve Buyer (R)
▌5. Dan Burton (R)
▌6. Mike Pence (R)
▌7. Julia Carson (D)
▌8. John Hostettler (R)
▌9. Mike Sodrel (R)

==== Iowa ====
▌1. Jim Nussle (R)
▌2. Jim Leach (R)
▌3. Leonard Boswell (D)
▌4. Tom Latham (R)
▌5. Steve King (R)

==== Kansas ====
▌1. Jerry Moran (R)
▌2. Jim Ryun (R)
▌3. Dennis Moore (D)
▌4. Todd Tiahrt (R)

==== Kentucky ====
▌1. Ed Whitfield (R)
▌2. Ron Lewis (R)
▌3. Anne Northup (R)
▌4. Geoff Davis (R)
▌5. Hal Rogers (R)
▌6. Ben Chandler (D)

==== Louisiana ====
▌1. Bobby Jindal (R)
▌2. William J. Jefferson (D)
▌3. Charlie Melançon (D)
▌4. Jim McCrery (R)
▌5. Rodney Alexander (R)
▌6. Richard H. Baker (R)
▌7. Charles Boustany (R)

==== Maine ====
▌1. Tom Allen (D)
▌2. Mike Michaud (D)

==== Maryland ====
▌1. Wayne Gilchrest (R)
▌2. Dutch Ruppersberger (D)
▌3. Ben Cardin (D)
▌4. Albert Wynn (D)
▌5. Steny Hoyer (D)
▌6. Roscoe Bartlett (R)
▌7. Elijah Cummings (D)
▌8. Chris Van Hollen (D)

==== Massachusetts ====
▌1. John Olver (D)
▌2. Richard Neal (D)
▌3. Jim McGovern (D)
▌4. Barney Frank (D)
▌5. Marty Meehan (D)
▌6. John Tierney (D)
▌7. Ed Markey (D)
▌8. Mike Capuano (D)
▌9. Stephen Lynch (D)
▌10. Bill Delahunt (D)

==== Michigan ====
▌1. Bart Stupak (D)
▌2. Peter Hoekstra (R)
▌3. Vern Ehlers (R)
▌4. David Lee Camp (R)
▌5. Dale Kildee (D)
▌6. Fred Upton (R)
▌7. Joe Schwarz (R)
▌8. Mike Rogers (R)
▌9. Joe Knollenberg (R)
▌10. Candice Miller (R)
▌11. Thaddeus McCotter (R)
▌12. Sander Levin (D)
▌13. Carolyn Cheeks Kilpatrick (D)
▌14. John Conyers (D)
▌15. John Dingell (D)

==== Minnesota ====
▌1. Gil Gutknecht (R)
▌2. John Kline (R)
▌3. Jim Ramstad (R)
▌4. Betty McCollum (DFL)
▌5. Martin Olav Sabo (DFL)
▌6. Mark Kennedy (R)
▌7. Collin Peterson (DFL)
▌8. James Oberstar (DFL)

==== Mississippi ====
▌1. Roger Wicker (R)
▌2. Bennie Thompson (D)
▌3. Chip Pickering (R)
▌4. Gene Taylor (D)

==== Missouri ====
▌1. Lacy Clay (D)
▌2. Todd Akin (R)
▌3. Russ Carnahan (D)
▌4. Ike Skelton (D)
▌5. Emanuel Cleaver (D)
▌6. Sam Graves (R)
▌7. Roy Blunt (R)
▌8. Jo Ann Emerson (R)
▌9. Kenny Hulshof (R)

==== Montana ====
▌At-large. Denny Rehberg (R)

==== Nebraska ====
▌1. Jeff Fortenberry (R)
▌2. Lee Terry (R)
▌3. Tom Osborne (R)

==== Nevada ====
▌1. Shelley Berkley (D)
▌2. Jim Gibbons (R), until December 31, 2006, vacant thereafter
▌3. Jon Porter (R)

==== New Hampshire ====
▌1. Jeb Bradley (R)
▌2. Charlie Bass (R)

==== New Jersey ====
▌1. Rob Andrews (D)
▌2. Frank LoBiondo (R)
▌3. Jim Saxton (R)
▌4. Chris Smith (R)
▌5. Scott Garrett (R)
▌6. Frank Pallone (D)
▌7. Mike Ferguson (R)
▌8. Bill Pascrell Jr. (D)
▌9. Steve Rothman (D)
▌10. Donald M. Payne (D)
▌11. Rodney Frelinghuysen (R)
▌12. Rush D. Holt Jr. (D)
▌13. Bob Menendez (D), until January 17, 2006

▌Albio Sires (D), from November 13, 2006

==== New Mexico ====
▌1. Heather Wilson (R)
▌2. Steve Pearce (R)
▌3. Tom Udall (D)

==== New York ====
▌1. Tim Bishop (D)
▌2. Steve Israel (D)
▌3. Peter T. King (R)
▌4. Carolyn McCarthy (D)
▌5. Gary Ackerman (D)
▌6. Gregory Meeks (D)
▌7. Joseph Crowley (D)
▌8. Jerry Nadler (D)
▌9. Anthony Weiner (D)
▌10. Edolphus Towns (D)
▌11. Major Owens (D)
▌12. Nydia Velázquez (D)
▌13. Vito Fossella (R)
▌14. Carolyn Maloney (D)
▌15. Charles Rangel (D)
▌16. José E. Serrano (D)
▌17. Eliot Engel (D)
▌18. Nita Lowey (D)
▌19. Sue W. Kelly (R)
▌20. John E. Sweeney (R)
▌21. Michael R. McNulty (D)
▌22. Maurice Hinchey (D)
▌23. John M. McHugh (R)
▌24. Sherwood Boehlert (R)
▌25. Jim Walsh (R)
▌26. Tom Reynolds (R)
▌27. Brian Higgins (D)
▌28. Louise McIntosh Slaughter (D)
▌29. Randy Kuhl (R)

==== North Carolina ====
▌1. G. K. Butterfield (D)
▌2. Bob Etheridge (D)
▌3. Walter B. Jones (R)
▌4. David Price (D)
▌5. Virginia Foxx (R)
▌6. Howard Coble (R)
▌7. Mike McIntyre (D)
▌8. Robin Hayes (R)
▌9. Sue Wilkins Myrick (R)
▌10. Patrick McHenry (R)
▌11. Charles H. Taylor (R)
▌12. Mel Watt (D)
▌13. Brad Miller (D)

==== North Dakota ====
▌At-large. Earl Pomeroy (D-NPL)

==== Ohio ====
▌1. Steve Chabot (R)
▌2. Rob Portman (R) until April 29, 2005

▌Jean Schmidt (R), from September 6, 2005

▌3. Mike Turner (R)
▌4. Mike Oxley (R)
▌5. Paul Gillmor (R)
▌6. Ted Strickland (D)
▌7. Dave Hobson (R)
▌8. John Boehner (R)
▌9. Marcia Kaptur (D)
▌10. Dennis Kucinich (D)
▌11. Stephanie Tubbs Jones (D)
▌12. Pat Tiberi (R)
▌13. Sherrod Brown (D)
▌14. Steve LaTourette (R)
▌15. Deborah Pryce (R)
▌16. Ralph Regula (R)
▌17. Tim Ryan (D)
▌18. Robert W. Ney (R) until November 3, 2006, vacant thereafter

==== Oklahoma ====
▌1. John Sullivan (R)
▌2. Dan Boren (D)
▌3. Frank Lucas (R)
▌4. Tom Cole (R)
▌5. Ernest Istook (R)

==== Oregon ====
▌1. David Wu (D)
▌2. Greg Walden (R)
▌3. Earl Blumenauer (D)
▌4. Peter DeFazio (D)
▌5. Darlene Hooley (D)

==== Pennsylvania ====
▌1. Bob Brady (D)
▌2. Chaka Fattah (D)
▌3. Phil English (R)
▌4. Melissa Hart (R)
▌5. John E. Peterson (R)
▌6. Jim Gerlach (R)
▌7. Curt Weldon (R)
▌8. Mike Fitzpatrick (R)
▌9. Bill Shuster (R)
▌10. Don Sherwood (R)
▌11. Paul Kanjorski (D)
▌12. John Murtha (D)
▌13. Allyson Schwartz (D)
▌14. Michael F. Doyle (D)
▌15. Charlie Dent (R)
▌16. Joseph R. Pitts (R)
▌17. Tim Holden (D)
▌18. Tim Murphy (R)
▌19. Todd Russell Platts (R)

==== Rhode Island ====
▌1. Patrick J. Kennedy (D)
▌2. James Langevin (D)

==== South Carolina ====
▌1. Henry E. Brown Jr. (R)
▌2. Joe Wilson (R)
▌3. Gresham Barrett (R)
▌4. Bob Inglis (R)
▌5. John Spratt (D)
▌6. Jim Clyburn (D)

==== South Dakota ====
▌At-large. Stephanie Herseth (D)

==== Tennessee ====
▌1. William L. Jenkins (R)
▌2. John Duncan (R)
▌3. Zach Wamp (R)
▌4. Lincoln Davis (D)
▌5. Jim Cooper (D)
▌6. Bart Gordon (D)
▌7. Marsha Blackburn (R)
▌8. John S. Tanner (D)
▌9. Harold Ford Jr. (D)

==== Texas ====
▌1. Louie Gohmert (R)
▌2. Ted Poe (R)
▌3. Sam Johnson (R)
▌4. Ralph Hall (R)
▌5. Jeb Hensarling (R)
▌6. Joe Barton (R)
▌7. John Culberson (R)
▌8. Kevin Brady (R)
▌9. Al Green (D)
▌10. Michael McCaul (R)
▌11. Mike Conaway (R)
▌12. Kay Granger (R)
▌13. Mac Thornberry (R)
▌14. Ron Paul (R)
▌15. Rubén Hinojosa (D)
▌16. Silvestre Reyes (D)
▌17. Chet Edwards (D)
▌18. Sheila Jackson-Lee (D)
▌19. Randy Neugebauer (R)
▌20. Charlie Gonzalez (D)
▌21. Lamar S. Smith (R)
▌22. Tom DeLay (R), until June 9, 2006

▌Shelley Sekula-Gibbs (R), from November 13, 2006

▌23. Henry Bonilla (R)
▌24. Kenny Marchant (R)
▌25. Lloyd Doggett (D)
▌26. Michael C. Burgess (R)
▌27. Solomon P. Ortiz (D)
▌28. Henry Cuellar (D)
▌29. Gene Green (D)
▌30. Eddie Bernice Johnson (D)
▌31. John Carter (R)
▌32. Pete Sessions (R)

==== Utah ====
▌1. Rob Bishop (R)
▌2. Jim Matheson (D)
▌3. Chris Cannon (R)

==== Vermont ====
▌At-large. Bernie Sanders (I)

==== Virginia ====
▌1. Jo Ann Davis (R)
▌2. Thelma Drake (R)
▌3. Robert C. Scott (D)
▌4. Randy Forbes (R)
▌5. Virgil Goode (R)
▌6. Bob Goodlatte (R)
▌7. Eric Cantor (R)
▌8. Jim Moran (D)
▌9. Rick Boucher (D)
▌10. Frank Wolf (R)
▌11. Thomas M. Davis (R)

==== Washington ====
▌1. Jay Inslee (D)
▌2. Rick Larsen (D)
▌3. Brian Baird (D)
▌4. Doc Hastings (R)
▌5. Cathy McMorris (R)
▌6. Norm Dicks (D)
▌7. Jim McDermott (D)
▌8. Dave Reichert (R)
▌9. Adam Smith (D)

==== West Virginia ====
▌1. Alan Mollohan (D)
▌2. Shelley Moore Capito (R)
▌3. Nick Rahall (D)

==== Wisconsin ====
▌1. Paul Ryan (R)
▌2. Tammy Baldwin (D)
▌3. Ron Kind (D)
▌4. Gwen Moore (D)
▌5. Jim Sensenbrenner (R)
▌6. Tom Petri (R)
▌7. Dave Obey (D)
▌8. Mark Green (R)

==== Wyoming ====
▌At-large. Barbara Cubin (R)

==== Non-voting members ====
▌American Samoa. Eni Faleomavaega (D)
▌District of Columbia. Eleanor Holmes Norton (D)
▌Guam. Madeleine Bordallo (D)
▌Puerto Rico. Luis Fortuño (Resident Commissioner) (R/PNP)
▌Virgin Islands. Donna Christian-Christensen (D)

Initial percentage of members of the House of Representatives from each party by state at the opening of the 109th Congress in January 2005

House majority leadership

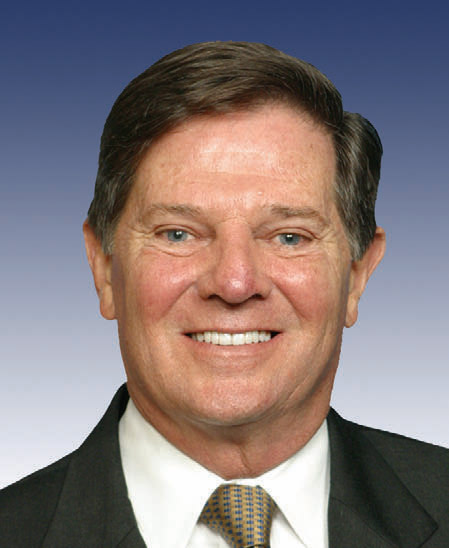
Republican leader
Tom DeLay
(until September 28, 2005)

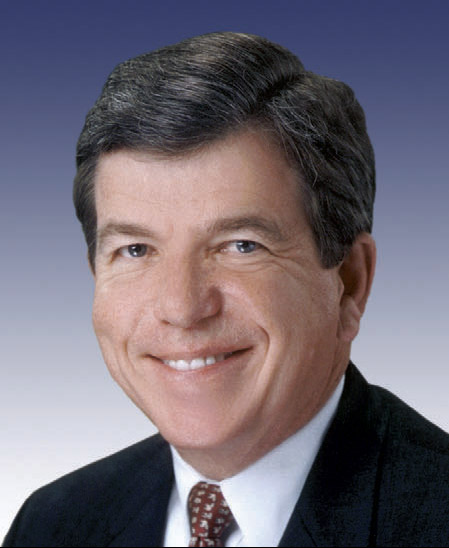
Republican whip and leader (acting)
Roy Blunt

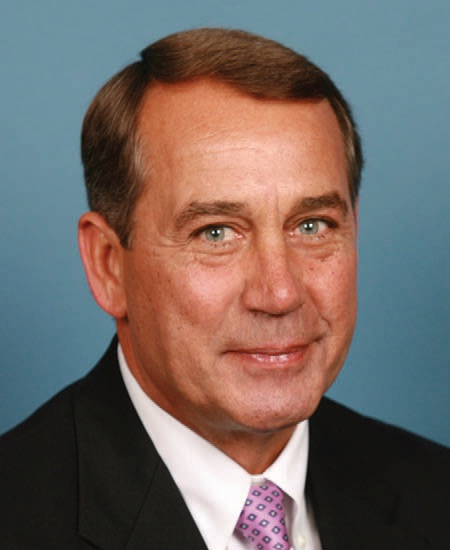
Republican leader
John Boehner
(from February 2, 2006)

House minority leadership

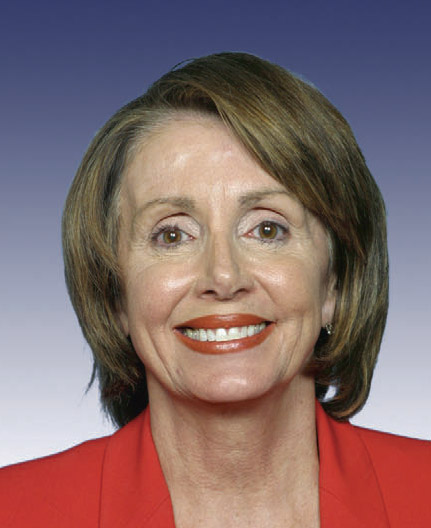
Democratic leader
Nancy Pelosi

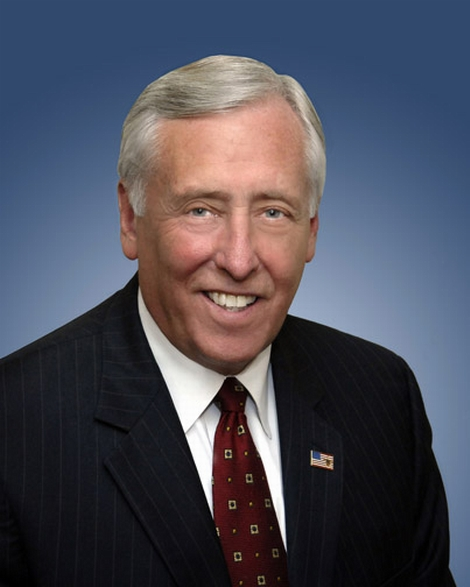
Democratic whip
Steny Hoyer

== Changes in membership ==
Members who came and left during this Congress.

=== Senate ===
Senate changes
State (class)	Vacated by	Reason for change	Successor	Date of successor's formal installation (Note: When seated or oath administered, not necessarily when service began.)
New Jersey (1)	Jon Corzine (D)	Incumbent resigned to become Governor of New Jersey on January 17, 2006. Successor appointed on January 18, 2006, and later elected for a full six-year term.	Bob Menendez (D)	January 18, 2006

=== House of Representatives ===
House changes
District	Vacated by	Reason for change	Successor	Date of successor's formal installation
California 5th	None	Representative Bob Matsui (D) died January 1, 2005, before the end of the previous Congress. A special election was held March 8, 2005.	Doris Matsui (D)	March 10, 2005
Ohio 2nd	Rob Portman (R)	Incumbent resigned April 29, 2005, to become the United States Trade Representative. A special election was held August 2, 2005.	Jean Schmidt (R)	September 6, 2005
California 48th	Christopher Cox (R)	Incumbent resigned August 2, 2005, to become chairman of the U.S. Securities and Exchange Commission. A special election was held December 6, 2005.	John Campbell (R)	December 7, 2005
California 50th	Duke Cunningham (R)	Incumbent resigned December 1, 2005, after pleading guilty to conspiracy for bribes and tax evasion. A special election was held June 6, 2006.	Brian Bilbray (R)	June 13, 2006
New Jersey 13th	Bob Menendez (D)	Incumbent resigned January 16, 2006 after being appointed a U.S. Senator. A special election was held November 7, 2006.	Albio Sires (D)	November 13, 2006
Texas 22nd	Tom DeLay (R)	Incumbent resigned June 9, 2006, after a series of criminal indictments. A special election was held November 6, 2006	Shelley Sekula-Gibbs (R)	November 13, 2006
Florida 16th	Mark Foley (R)	Incumbent resigned September 29, 2006, after a teen sex scandal.	Remained vacant until the next Congress.	
Ohio 18th	Bob Ney (R)	Incumbent resigned November 3, 2006, after pleading guilty to conspiracy.	Remained vacant until the next Congress.	
Nevada 2nd	Jim Gibbons (R)	Incumbent resigned December 31, 2006, to become Governor of Nevada.	Remained vacant until the next Congress.	

== Committees ==
Lists of committees and their party leaders for members of the House and Senate committees can be found through the Official Congressional Directory at the bottom of this article. The directory after the pages of terms of service lists committees of the Senate, House (Standing with Subcommittees, Select and Special) and Joint and, after that, House/Senate committee assignments. On the committees section of the House and Senate in the Official Congressional Directory, the committee's members on the first row on the left side shows the chairman of the committee and on the right side shows the ranking member of the committee.

=== Senate ===
Committee	Chairman	Ranking Member
Aging (special)	Gordon Smith (R-OR)	Herb Kohl (D-WI)
Agriculture, Nutrition and Forestry	Saxby Chambliss (R-GA)	Tom Harkin (D-IA)
Appropriations	Thad Cochran (R-MS)	Robert Byrd (D-WV)
Armed Services	John Warner (R-VA)	Carl Levin (D-MI)
Banking, Housing and Urban Affairs	Richard Shelby (R-AL)	Paul Sarbanes (D-MD)
Budget	Judd Gregg (R-NH)	Kent Conrad (D-ND)
Commerce, Science and Transportation	Ted Stevens (R-AK)	Daniel Inouye (D-HI)
Energy and Natural Resources	Pete Domenici (R-NM)	Jeff Bingaman (D-NM)
Environment and Public Works	Jim Inhofe (R-OK)	Jim Jeffords (I-VT)
Ethics (select)	George Voinovich (R-OH)	Tim Johnson (D-SD)
Finance	Chuck Grassley (R-IA)	Max Baucus (D-MT)
Foreign Relations	Richard Lugar (R-IN)	Joe Biden (D-DE)
Health, Education, Labor and Pensions	Mike Enzi (R-WY)	Ted Kennedy (D-MA)
Homeland Security and Governmental Affairs	Susan Collins (R-ME)	Joe Lieberman (I-CT)
Indian Affairs	John McCain (R-AZ)	Byron Dorgan (D-ND)
Intelligence (select)	Pat Roberts (R-KS)	Jay Rockefeller (D-WV)
Judiciary	Arlen Specter (R-PA)	Patrick Leahy (D-VT)
Rules and Administration	Trent Lott (R-MS)	Chris Dodd (D-CT)
Small Business and Entrepreneurship	Olympia Snowe (R-ME)	John Kerry (D-MA)
Veterans' Affairs	Larry Craig (R-ID)	Daniel Akaka (D-HI)

=== House of Representatives ===
- Agriculture (Bob Goodlatte, Chair; Collin C. Peterson, Ranking Member)
  - Conservation, Credit, Rural Development and Research (Tim Holden, Chair; Frank D. Lucas, Ranking Member)
  - Department Operations, Oversight (Gil Gutknecht, Chair; Joe Baca, Ranking Member)
  - General Farm Commodities and Risk Management (Jerry Moran, Chair; Bob Etheridge, Ranking Member)
  - Livestock and Horticulture (Robin Hayes, Chair; Ed Case, Ranking Member)
  - Speciality Crops and Foreign Agriculture Programs (William L. Jenkins, Chair; Mike McIntyre, Ranking Member)
- Appropriations (Jerry Lewis, Chair; David R. Obey, Ranking Member)
  - Agriculture, Rural Development, Food and Drug Administration and Related Agencies (Henry Bonilla, Chair; Rosa L. DeLauro, Ranking Member)
  - Defense (C. W. Bill Young, Chair; John P. Murtha, Ranking Member)
  - Energy, Water Development and Related Agencies (David Hobson, Chair; John P. Murtha, Ranking Member)
  - Foreign Operations, Export Financing and Related Agencies (Jim Kolbe, Chair; Nita Lowey, Ranking Member)
  - Homeland Security (Harold Rogers, Chair; Martin Olav Sabo, Ranking Member)
  - Interior, Environment and Related Agencies (David L. Hobson, Chair; Pete Visclosky, Ranking Member)
  - Labor, Health, Human Services, Education and Related Agencies (Ralph Regula, Chair; David R. Obey, Ranking Member)
  - Military Quality of Life and Veterans' Affairs and Related Agencies (James T. Walsh, Chair; Chet Edwards, Ranking Member)
  - Science, The Departments of State, Justice and Commerce and Related Agencies (Charles H. Taylor, Chair; Norman D. Dicks, Ranking Member)
  - Transportation, Treasury, HUD, The Judiciary, District of Columbia and Independent Agencies (Joe Knollenberg, Chair; John Olver, Ranking Member)
- Armed Services (Duncan Hunter, Chair; Ike Skelton, Ranking Member)
  - Military Personnel (John M. McHugh, Chair; Vic Snyder, Ranking Member)
  - Projection Forces (Roscoe G. Bartlett, Chair; Gene Taylor, Ranking Member)
  - Readiness (Joel Hefley, Chair; Solomon P. Ortiz, Ranking Member)
  - Strategic Forces (Terry Everett, Chair; Silvestre Reyes, Ranking Member)
  - Tactical Air and Land Forces (Curt Weldon, Chair; Neil Abercrombie, Ranking Member)
  - Terrorism, Unconventional Threats and Capabilities (Jim Saxton, Chair; Marty Meehan, Ranking Member)
- Budget (Jim Nussle, Chair; John M. Spratt Jr., Ranking Member)
- Education and the Workforce (John Boehner, Chair; George Miller, Ranking Member)
  - Education Reform (Michael Castle, Chair; Lynn Woolsey, Ranking Member)
  - Employer-Employee Relations (Sam Johnson, Chair; Robert E. Andrews, Ranking Member)
  - Select Education (Patrick Tiberi, Chair; Ruben Hinojosa, Ranking Member)
  - 21st Century Competitiveness (Buck McKeon, Chair; Dale Kildee, Ranking Member)
  - Workforce Protections (Charlie Norwood, Chair; Major Owens, Ranking Member)
- Energy and Commerce (Joe Barton, Chair; John D. Dingell, Ranking Member)
  - Commerce, Trade and Consumer Protection (Cliff Stearns, Chair; Janice D. Schakowsky, Ranking Member)
  - Energy and Air Quality (Ralph M. Hall, Chair; Rick Boucher, Ranking Member)
  - Environment and Hazardous Materials (Paul E. Gillmor, Chair; Hilda Solis, Ranking Member)
  - Health (Nathan Deal, Chair; Sherrod Brown, Ranking Member)
  - Oversight and Investigations (Ed Whitfield, Chair; Bart Stupak, Ranking Member)
  - Telecommunications and the Internet (Fred Upton, Chair; Ed Markey, Ranking Member)
- Financial Services (Mike Oxley, Chair; Barney Frank, Ranking Member)
  - Capital Markets, Insurance and Government-Sponsored Enterprises (Richard H. Baker, Chair; Paul Kanjorski, Ranking Member)
  - Domestic, International Monetary Policy, Trade and Technology (Deborah Pryce, Chair; Carolyn Maloney, Ranking Member)
  - Financial Institutions and Consumer Credit (Spencer Bachus, Chair; Bernie Sanders, Ranking Member)
  - Housing and Community Opportunity (Bob Ney, Chair; Maxine Waters, Ranking Member)
  - Oversight and Investigations (Sue W. Kelly, Chair; Luis Guiterrez, Ranking Member)
- Government Reform (Tom Davis, Chair; Henry Waxman, Ranking Member)
  - Criminal Justice, Drug Policy and Human Resources (Mark Souder, Chair; Elijah Cummings, Ranking Member)
  - Energy and Resources (Darrell E. Issa, Chair; Diane E. Watson, Ranking Member)
  - Federal Workforce and Agency Organization (Jon C. Porter, Chair; Danny K. Davis, Ranking Member)
  - Federalism and the Census (Michael R. Turner, Chair; William Lacy Clay, Ranking Member)
  - Governmental Management, Finance and Accountability (Todd Russell Platts, Chair; Edolphus Towns, Ranking Member)
  - National Security, Emerging Threats and International Resources (Chris Shays, Chair; Dennis J. Kucinich, Ranking Member)
  - Regulatory Affairs (Candice S. Miller, Chair; Stephen Lynch, Ranking Member)
- Homeland Security (Christopher Cox, Chair; Bennie Thompson, Ranking Member)
  - Economic Security, Infrastructure Protection and Cybersecurity (Dan Lungren, Chair; Loretta Sanchez, Ranking Member)
  - Emergency Preparedness, Science and Technology (Peter King, Chair; Bill Pascrell Jr., Ranking Member)
  - Intelligence, Information Sharing and Terrorism Risk Assessment (Rob Simmons, Chair; Zoe Lofgren, Ranking Member)
  - Management, Integration and Oversight (Mike Rogers, Chair; Kendrick Meek, Ranking Member)
  - Prevention of Nuclear and Biological Attack (John Linder, Chair; James R. Langevin, Ranking Member)
- House Administration (Bob Ney, later Vern Ehlers, Chair; Juanita Millender-McDonald, Ranking Member)
- Hurricane Katrina (Select)
- Intelligence (Select) (Peter Hoekstra, Chair; Jane Harman, Ranking Member)
- International Relations (Henry Hyde, Chair; Tom Lantos, Ranking Member)
  - Africa, Global Human Rights and International Operations (Chris Smith, Chair; Donald M. Payne, Ranking Member)
  - Asia and the Pacific (Jim Leach, Chair; Eni Faleomavaega, Ranking Member)
  - Europe and Emerging Threats (Elton Gallegly, Chair; Robert Wexler, Ranking Member)
  - International Terrorism and Nonproliferation (Edward R. Royce, Chair; Brad Sherman, Ranking Member)
  - The Middle East and Central Asia (Ileana Ros-Lehtinen, Chair; Gary Ackerman, Ranking Member)
  - Oversight and Investigations (Dana Rohrabacher, Chair; William D. Delahunt, Ranking Member)
  - The Western Hemisphere (Dan Burton, Chair; Robert Menendez, Ranking Member)
- Judiciary (Jim Sensenbrenner, Chair; John Conyers, Ranking Member)
  - Commercial and Administrative Law (Chris Cannon, Chair; Mel Watt, Ranking Member)
  - The Constitution (Steve Chabot, Chair; Jerrold Nadler, Ranking Member)
  - Courts, the Internet, and Intellectual Property (Lamar S. Smith, Chair; Howard L. Berman, Ranking Member)
  - Crime, Terrorism and Homeland Security (Howard Coble, Chair; Bobby Scott, Ranking Member)
  - Immigration, Border Security and Claims (John N. Hostettler, Chair; Sheila Jackson-Lee, Ranking Member)
- Resources (Richard W. Pombo, Chair; Nick J. Rahall, Ranking Member)
  - Energy and Mineral Resources (Jim Gibbons, Chair; Raul Grijalva, Ranking Member)
  - Fisheries Conservation, Wildlife and Oceans (Wayne T. Gilchrest, Chair; Frank Pallone Jr., Ranking Member)
  - Forests and Forest Health (Greg Walden, Chair; Tom Udall, Ranking Member)
  - National Parks, Recreation and Public Lands (Devin Nunes, Chair; Donna Christian-Christensen, Ranking Member)
  - Water and Power (George P. Radanovich, Chair; Grace F. Napolitano, Ranking Member)
- Rules (David Dreier, Chair; Louise M. Slaughter, Ranking Member)
  - Legislative and Budget Process (Lincoln Diaz-Balart, Chair; Alcee Hastings, Ranking Member)
  - Rules and Organization of the House (Doc Hastings, Chair; Jim McGovern, Ranking Member)
- Science (Sherwood Boehlert, Chair; Bart Gordon, Ranking Member)
  - Energy (Judy Biggert, Chair; Michael M. Honda, Ranking Member)
  - Environment, Technology and Standards (Vernon J. Ehlers, Chair; David Wu, Ranking Member)
  - Research (Bob Inglis, Chair; Darlene Hooley, Ranking Member)
  - Space and Aeronautics (Ken Calvert, Chair; Mark Udall, Ranking Member)
- Small Business (Donald A. Manzullo, Chair; Nydia M. Velazquez, Ranking Member)
  - Regulatory Reform and Oversight (W. Todd Akin, Chair; Madeleine Bordallo, Ranking Member)
  - Rural Enterprises, Agriculture and Technology Sam Graves Chair; John Barrow, Ranking Member)
  - Tax, Finance and Exports (Jeb Bradley, Chair; Juanita Millender-McDonald, Ranking Member)
  - Workforce, Empowerment and Government Programs (Marilyn Musgrave, Chair; Daniel Lipinski, Ranking Member)
- Standards of Official Conduct (Doc Hastings, Chair; Alan B. Mollohan, Ranking Member)
- Transportation and Infrastructure (Don Young, Chair; James L. Oberstar, Ranking Member)
  - Aviation (John Mica, Chair; Jerry Costello, Ranking Member)
  - Coast Guard and Maritime Transportation (Frank A. LoBiondo, Chair; Bob Filner, Ranking Member)
  - Economic Development, Public Buildings and Emergency Management (Bill Shuster, Chair; Eleanor Holmes Norton, Ranking Member)
  - Highways, Transit and Pipelines (Tom Petri, Chair; Peter DeFazio, Ranking Member)
  - Railroads (Steve LaTourette, Chair; Corrine Brown, Ranking Member)
  - Water Resources and Environment (John Duncan Jr., Chair; Eddie Bernice Johnson, Ranking Member)
- Veterans' Affairs (Steve Buyer, Chair; Lane Evans, Ranking Member)
  - Disability Assistance and Memorial Affairs (Jeff Miller, Chair; Shelley Berkley, Ranking Member)
  - Economic Opportunity (John Boozman, Chair; Stephanie Herseth Sandlin, Ranking Member)
  - Health (Henry E. Brown Jr., Chair; Michael Michaud, Ranking Member)
  - Oversight and Investigations (Michael Bilirakis, Chair; Ted Strickland, Ranking Member)
- Ways and Means (Bill Thomas, Chair; Charles B. Rangel, Ranking Member)
  - Health (Nancy Johnson, Chair; Pete Stark, Ranking Member)
  - Human Resources (Wally Herger, Chair; Jim McDermott, Ranking Member)
  - Oversight (Jim Ramstad, Chair; John Lewis, Ranking Member)
  - Select Revenue Measures (Dave Camp, Chair; Michael McNulty, Ranking Member)
  - Social Security (Jim McCrery, Chair; Sander Levin, Ranking Member)
  - Trade (E. Clay Shaw Jr., Chair; Ben Cardin, Ranking Member)
- Whole

=== Joint committees ===
- Economic (Rep. Jim Saxton, Chair; Sen. Robert F. Bennett, Vice Chair)
- The Library (Rep. Bob Ney, Chair; Sen. Ted Stevens, Vice Chair)
- Printing (Sen. Trent Lott, Chair; Rep. Bob Ney, Vice Chair)
- Taxation (Rep. Bill Thomas, Chair; Sen. Chuck Grassley, Vice Chair)

== Employees ==
=== Legislative branch agency directors ===
- Architect of the Capitol: Alan M. Hantman
- Attending Physician of the United States Congress: John F. Eisold
- Comptroller General of the United States: David M. Walker
- Director of the Congressional Budget Office: Douglas Holtz-Eakin, until December 29, 2005
  - Donald B. Marron Jr., from December 29, 2005
- Librarian of Congress: James H. Billington
- Public Printer of the United States: Bruce James, until 2006
  - vacant, from 2006

=== Senate ===
- Chaplain: Barry C. Black (Seventh-day Adventist)
- Curator: Diane K. Skvarla
- Historian: Richard A. Baker
- Parliamentarian: Alan Frumin
- Secretary: Emily J. Reynolds
- Librarian: Greg Harness
- Sergeant at Arms: William H. Pickle
- Secretary for the Majority: David J. Schiappa
- Secretary for the Minority: Martin P. Paone

=== House of Representatives ===
Employees include: (Note: See also: Rules of the House, Rule 2: "Other officers and officials")

- Chaplain: Daniel P. Coughlin (Roman Catholic)
- Chief Administrative Officer: James M. Eagen III
- Clerk: Jeff Trandahl, until November 18, 2005
  - Karen L. Haas, from December 1, 2005
- Historian: Robert V. Remini
- Parliamentarian: John V. Sullivan
- Reading Clerks: Paul Hays (R) and Mary Kevin Niland (D)
- Sergeant at Arms: Wilson Livingood
- Inspector General: James J. Cornell

== See also ==
=== Elections ===
- 2004 United States elections (elections leading to this Congress)
  - 2004 United States presidential election
  - 2004 United States Senate elections
  - 2004 United States House of Representatives elections
- 2006 United States elections (elections during this Congress, leading to the next Congress)
  - 2006 United States Senate elections
  - 2006 United States House of Representatives elections

=== Membership lists ===
- List of new members of the 109th United States Congress
