= Carolyn Cole =

American photojournalist (born 1961)

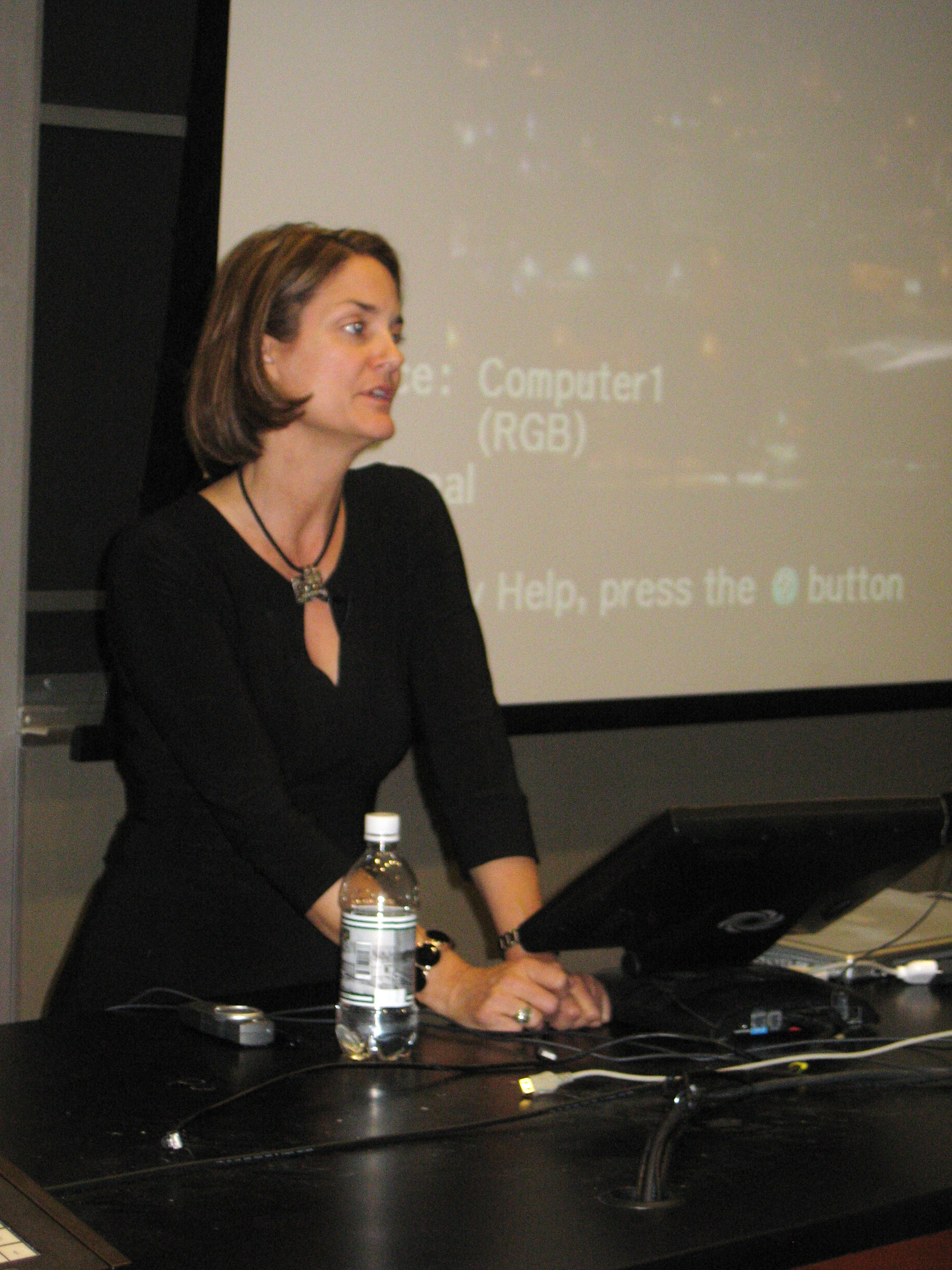
- Cole speaks at Ohio University (2009)
- Born: April 24, 1961 (age 65)
- Education: Bachelor of Arts from the University of Texas at Austin; Master of Arts from Ohio University
- Title: Staff photographer for the Los Angeles Times

Carolyn Cole (born April 24, 1961) is a staff photographer for the Los Angeles Times. She won the Pulitzer Prize for Feature Photography in 2004 for her coverage of the siege of Monrovia in 2003, the capital of Liberia.

== Education ==
Cole graduated from the University of Texas in 1983 with a bachelor of arts, majoring in photojournalism. She earned a master of arts from the School of Visual Communication in the Scripps College of Communication at Ohio University.

== Career beginnings ==
She began her career in 1986 as a staff photographer with the El Paso Herald-Post, a position which she occupied until 1988. She then moved to the San Francisco Examiner for two years, before spending another two years as a freelance photographer in Mexico City, working with newspapers such as the Los Angeles Times, Detroit Free Press, and Business Week. In 1992, Cole returned to being a staff photographer, working for The Sacramento Bee, before moving to the Times in 1994.

== Recognitions ==
In 1994, the same year she moved to the Times, she was recognized in their editorial awards for her pictures of the crisis in Haiti. The following year, she was recognized again, this time for her work in Russia. In 1997, she gained attention for her photographs of dying bank robber Emil Mătăsăreanu, who had been shot after a nationally televised shootout with police. Her evidence was used in the wrongful death lawsuit filed by his family. Her pictures also helped the Times win a Pulitzer Prize for its coverage of the event. Later that year, she was named Journalist of the Year by the Times Mirror Corporation. In 2002, she received the National Press Photographers Association Newspaper Photographer of the Year award for the first time. In mid-2003, Cole went to Liberia, as rebels surrounded the capital, Monrovia, demanding the resignation of President Charles Taylor. This trip was to earn her the 2004 Pulitzer Prize, "for her cohesive, behind-the-scenes look at the effects of civil war in Liberia, with special attention to innocent citizens caught in the conflict." She won the 2003 George Polk Award for photojournalism.

In 2004, Cole was named both NPPA Newspaper Photographer of the Year for a second time, for her work in both Liberia and Iraq, and the Pictures of the Year International Newspaper Photographer by the University of Missouri's Missouri School of Journalism. This made her the first person to win all three of America's top photojournalism awards in the same year. During the year, she also spent time in Haiti, witnessing the fall of the regime of Jean-Bertrand Aristide. Cole has also received the Robert Capa Gold Medal from the Overseas Press Club in both 2003 and 2004, and won two World Press Photo awards in 2004. In 2006, Cole won second prize in the category Natural Disaster Picture Story of the 63rd Pictures of the Year annual competition for her picture of Milvirtha Hendricks.

In 2007, she won the NPPA Newspaper Photographer of the Year.

== Arrest ==
In April 2000, Cole was arrested on felony charges for "throwing deadly missiles" at police during protests in Miami's "Little Havana" during the Elián González affair. Cole and the Times denied the charges, which were later dropped.

== Pulitzer Prize nomination ==
Cole spent time in Kosovo during the 1999 crisis, and in 2001, spent two months in Afghanistan. In 2002, Cole covered the beginnings of the prominent siege of Bethlehem's Church of the Nativity, which had been occupied by Palestinian militants. Then, on May 2, she made a last-minute decision to join a group of peace activists who entered the building in solidarity with the Palestinians. Over the nine days that followed, she doubled as a news reporter for the Times, filing several stories. She was the only photojournalist in the building itself. The pictures she took earned her a nomination for the 2003 Pulitzer Prize.
