= Political effects of Hurricane Katrina =

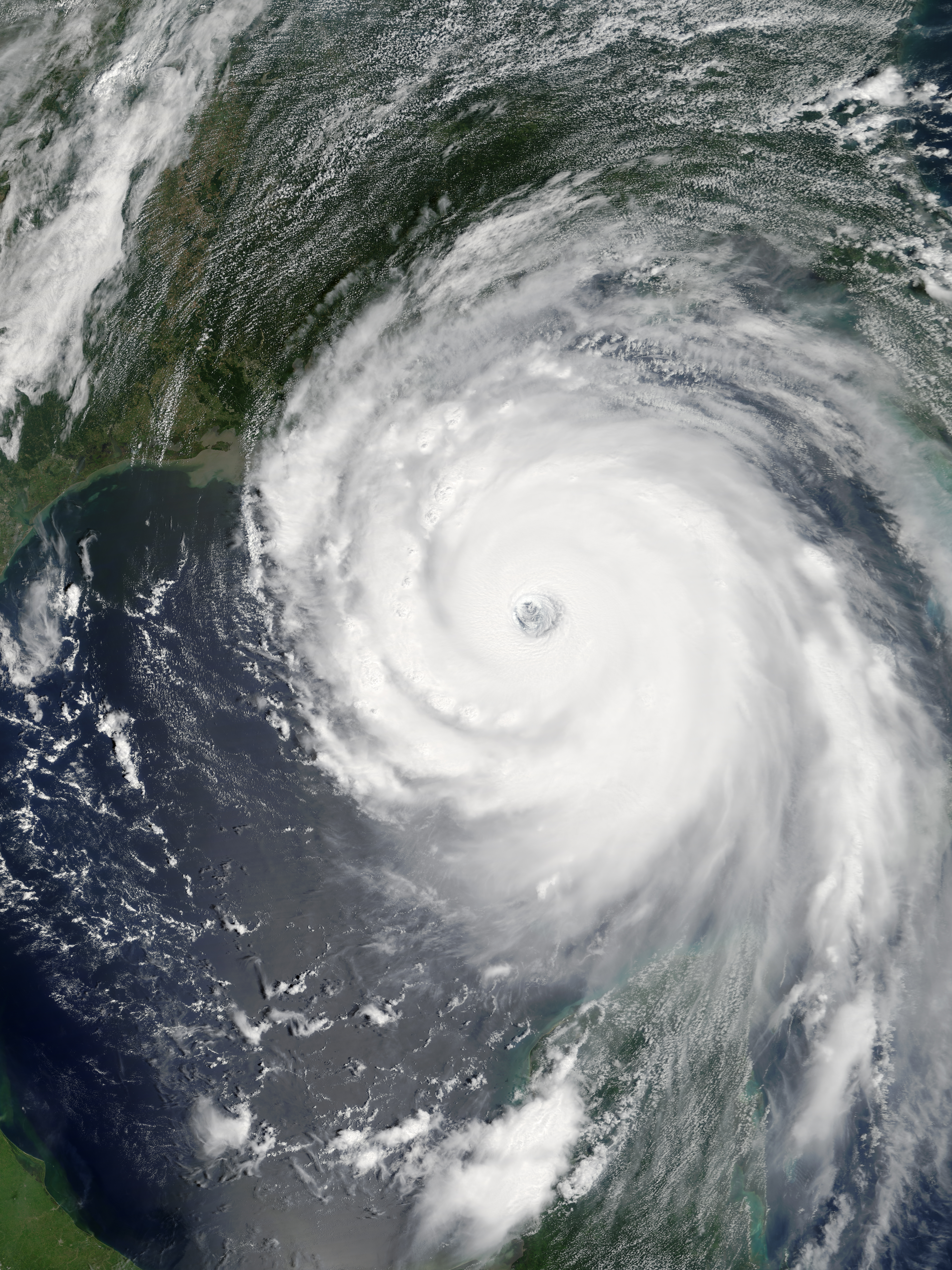
Hurricane Katrina over the Gulf of Mexico on August 28, 2005, one day before landfall

Hurricane Katrina struck the United States on August 29, 2005, causing over a thousand deaths and extreme property damage, particularly in New Orleans. The incident affected numerous areas of governance, including disaster preparedness and environmental policy.

== Political controversies and electoral consequences ==
- Whether the flood protection designed and built by the federal US Army Corps of Engineers, was mis-engineered or should have held back the storm surge. This issue is complicated by a) the design goals given to the Corps of Engineers by state officials decades past did not request a 100-year flood level protection (which is near ten times as costly as 50-year flood protection) and b) that over-topping of earthen levees will destroy them in a short time by their very design (this is not considered a "failure" by definition), but much more costly concrete levees should not fail in such situations without impact damage from debris which is possible, even under the waterline. "Holding back the storm surge" is only possible for well-maintained levees of appropriate height and strength... the taller the levee, the more it can hold back, and the more it costs to build and maintain. The variation of weather and maintenance budgets makes finding the appropriate "threshold" difficult. Due to this "cost efficiency / diminishing returns" factor, and the weather forecasting ability the primary protection for any flood situation is the proper evacuation of flood-prone areas in a timely manner.
- Whether loss of coastal wetlands resulted in increased flooding further inland. This question was also brought up by the Mississippi Flood of 1996 which was blamed not only on excessive rainfall but the extensive levee building along the river which attempted to reclaim flood plains for the fertile farming area. Channeling floodwaters via levees will increase storm surge height, and previous levees built may not be tall enough after surrounding areas develop levees. This debate plays directly into the fact that the lower 9th ward itself is a reclaimed wetland/swamp raising flood risk for others around Lake Pontchartrain, raising the ethical issue of rebuilding/pumping out the 9th ward after its flooding.
- Whether lax state environmental regulations for the storage of toxic chemicals has increased the contamination of floodwaters.

=== Long-term issues ===
- Whether the US Army Corps of Engineers needs reform in their design and construction policies
- Whether Congress needs reform in the way flood protection projects are chosen and funded
- Whether policies that affect the poor, such as bankruptcy legislation, should be changed to make it easier for those in poverty to recover from such a disaster.
- If electoral district changes will occur due to large migration of displaced people (e.g., reducing Louisiana's electoral college votes, and how many congressmen they may contribute to the House of Representatives).
- The question of exclusive government assistance / compensation funds should be available to Katrina/Rita survivors similar to the funds set up for 9-11 survivors or whether existing social nets are appropriate.

== Congressional Committee Establishment ==
On September 15, 2005, it was announced that a Bipartisan Congressional Committee had been established to investigate the United States government's preparations for and responses to Hurricane Katrina. This decision was preceded by many different positions of members of the House of Representatives, which are outlined below.

=== Arguments for the Establishment of a Congressional Committee ===
Honorable David Dreier was elected to the U.S. House of Representatives in 1980. He was a Republican Representative from California, and served as the House Rules Committee's Chairman. The following information is regarding the House of Representatives' debate and more specifically, Honorable Dreier's viewpoint on whether to establish a Bipartisan Congressional Committee to investigate the U.S. government's preparations for Hurricane Katrina.

Honorable Dreier agreed with President Bush when he claimed that there were many undesirable characteristics of the government's initial response to Hurricane Katrina. In his debate to the House of Representatives, Honorable Dreier expressed that the Federal Emergency Management System's (FEMA) department head had resigned after the events of Hurricane Katrina. He stated that from what happened during the disaster, there were certainly lessons to be taken away. He called for action from his fellow representatives that there must be an acceptance of the Executive Branch's powers to investigate what went wrong in the response to Hurricane Katrina. In his strong declaration to the House of Representatives, Honorable Dreier made it very clear that a Bipartisan Congressional Committee was necessary in order to follow the nation's precedents and traditions.

As well as this, many delegates viewed an independent commission to be a ridiculous idea and redundant of sorts. They believe that Americans wanted immediate solutions to the hurdles they were being faced with as a result of the lack of preparation for Hurricane Katrina.

=== Arguments Against the Establishment of a Congressional Committee ===
In 1993, Honorable Bennie Thompson was elected to the United States House of Representatives. He was a Democratic representative from Mississippi, and served as the mayor of Bolton from 1973 to 1979. He also serves as the Homeland Security Committee's ranking minority member. Below is information regarding Honorable Thompson's viewpoint on whether to establish a bipartisan Congressional committee during the debate of the U.S. House of Representatives.

Honorable Thompson's opposition began with his perspective that it is not necessary for a Congressional committee to be entrusted with the investigation. He compared Congress being permitted to investigate the government's preparedness to a fox guarding a hen house, in which he stated that the government is not safeguarding what needs to be safeguarded. He strongly believed that instead of establishing a Congressional committee, there should be an independent assessment of where the government went wrong. As the ranking minority member of the Homeland Security Committee, he submitted a document outlining the complexity of the problems regarding what happened during Hurricane Katrina and the need for an independent assessment.

As well as Honorable Bennie Thompson, many other delegates of the U.S. House of Representatives were not shy in sharing their viewpoints as to why there should not have been a Congressional committee established. They gave their perspectives on a variety of issues why a Congressional committee was an inadequate idea. Many members of the Democratic party were not keen about establishing this Congressional committee, as it would have been composed of mainly Republican delegates. The Democrats involved in voicing their opinions did not want the power to be only in the hands of the Republicans, and therefore, voted in opposition of the establishment.

== Policies affecting hurricane defenses ==
=== Prevention and evacuation issues ===
According to the National Response Plan, the Department of Homeland Security "will assume responsibility on March 1 [2005] for ensuring that emergency response professionals are prepared for any situation. This will entail providing a coordinated, comprehensive federal response to any large-scale crisis and mounting a swift and effective recovery effort". Many critics have noted that while Mayor Nagin gave a mandatory evacuation order on August 28, before the storm hit, they did not make sufficient prevention and provisions to evacuate the homeless, the poor, the elderly, the infirm, or the car-less households. Hospitals, nursing homes, and group homes were supposed to have pre-determined evacuation and/or refuge plans in place. Foreign nationals without transport claimed that the police refused to evacuate them, giving bus places only to American citizens.

Despite this, 90% of Greater New Orleans was evacuated—the most successful and complete evacuation of a US city since the American Civil War.

Prior to this, on August 27 the White House issued a statement, effective August 26, authorizing federal emergency assistance for Louisiana. The statement authorized the Department of Homeland Security (DHS) and the Federal Emergency Management Agency (FEMA) to coordinate disaster relief and "... required emergency measures, authorized under Title V of the Stafford Act, to save lives, protect property and public health and safety, or to lessen or avert the threat of a catastrophe in the parishes of Allen, Avoyelles, Beauregard, Bienville, Bossier, Caddo, Caldwell, Claiborne, Catahoula, Concordia, De Soto, East Baton Rouge, East Carroll, East Feliciana, Evangeline, Franklin, Grant, Jackson, LaSalle, Lincoln, Livingston, Madison, Morehouse, Natchitoches, Pointe Coupee, Ouachita, Rapides, Red River, Richland, Sabine, St. Helena, St. Landry, Tensas, Union, Vernon, Webster, West Carroll, West Feliciana, and Winn." This includes all the parishes in the state of Louisiana except the coastal parishes which are inherently exposed to the most destructive forces of a hurricane. The President had not yet authorized FEMA to enter the coastal areas despite the governor's request including those parishes. The governor activated the National Guard with her August 26, State of Emergency Declaration Red Cross relief in New Orleans remains forbidden by the governor.

According to the Louisiana Evacuation plan, evacuation was mainly left up to individual citizens to find their own way out of the city. It was known that many residents of New Orleans lacked cars. It is also believed that many citizens, having survived previous hurricanes, did not anticipate the impending catastrophe and chose to ride out the storm. Even so, a 2000 census revealed that 27% of New Orleans households, amounting to approximately 120,000 people, were without privately owned transportation. Additionally, at 38%, New Orleans has one of the highest poverty rates in the United States. These factors may have prevented many people from being able to evacuate on their own. Consequently, most of those stranded in the city are the poor, the elderly, and the sick.

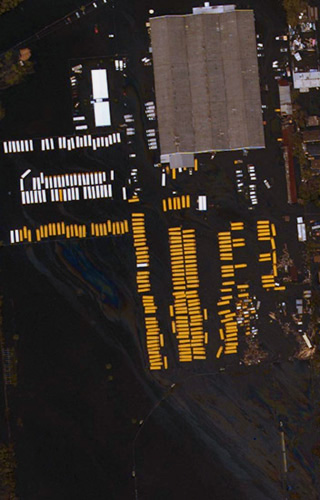
Aerial view of flooded New Orleans school buses

State and city evacuation plans ( Part 1 Section C and part II-2) mention use of school buses for evacuation. With the following language: "The primary means of hurricane evacuation will be personal vehicles. School and municipal buses, government-owned vehicles and vehicles provided by volunteer agencies may be used to provide transportation for individuals who lack transportation and require assistance in evacuating." Several hundred school buses were left parked on low ground where they would be easily flooded with storm water and then later by the levee flooding making their use impossible in the emergency evacuation. It is not clear whether these buses were owned by the city or by a private contractor to which the city had outsourced school bus services. Mayor Nagin testified in his hearing in Washington that those buses were owned by the school board and that he had no control over them. The precise number of buses available has been cited anywhere from a few hundred to a likely exaggerated 2,000.

During non-emergency times, drivers of school buses must own and maintain a class D commercial license or better depending on the exact size and weight of the bus. During an emergency any driver is suitable as long as approved by the governor. In spite of risks and his lack of formal training or license, 20-year-old Jabbar Gibson commandeered a New Orleans school bus and rescued 70 people from the rising floodwaters before making the 13-hour drive to Houston's Reliant Astrodome, arriving on Wednesday evening. A day later a commercially licensed driver's bus filled with evacuees flipped, resulting in one death and many injuries after a passenger fought with the driver.

In a phone call to WWL radio made after the idle school and RTA buses were flooded, Mayor Nagin called for 500 Greyhound buses to be sent from outside the city to help evacuate. Coordination of transportation from outside the Parish is the responsibility of the governor according to the State Evacuation Plan (Part 1 Section D). Governor Blanco had yet to exercise this responsibility.

Some evacuees report that the drive from New Orleans to Baton Rouge took anywhere from five hours to nine hours; this drive usually takes up to an hour. Reports from the Associated Press state that 80% of the near 500,000 had evacuated safely from New Orleans prior to the hurricane's landfall. Even if licensed drivers had been available and the available buses had been used to evacuate the remaining approximately 150,000 people, they may not have made it to safety before landfall.

This massive migration is the largest since the Dust Bowl of the 1930s sent about 300,000 people from the Great Plains States to other regions of the U.S., most notably California.

=== New Orleans flood defenses ===
Early questions arose on why the flood protection system designed and built by the US Army Corps of Engineers failed catastrophically in 53 different places in metro New Orleans.

In 1965, with passage of the Flood Control Act of 1965, the United States Congress gave the US Army Corps of Engineers (USACE) the Federal responsibility for the design and construction of the flood protection in Greater New Orleans in the Pontchartrain Hurricane Protection Project, subject to appropriations and local participation, some of which was later waived. Local municipalities were designated the responsibility for maintenance once the projects were complete (source: GAO testimony summary attached).

When authorized, this Congressional mandate was projected to take 13 years to complete. When the flood protection system failed in 2005, the project was between 60 and 90% complete and the projected date of completion was estimated to be 2015, nearly 50 years after it first gained authorization from Congress.

The levees themselves were designed to protect New Orleans from a direct hit by a Category 3 hurricane. This decision was made by the Corps decades ago "based on a cost-benefit analysis", according to Lt. Gen. Carl Strock, USACE's Chief of Engineers. However, when Hurricane Katrina passed east of New Orleans, it was a weakening Category 4 storm.

Questions have been raised about proper funding for the Corps of Engineers, which is in charge of many hurricane-protection programs across the United States. Sidney Blumenthal, from the Clinton Administration, appeared as a guest on BBC's The World on September 1, 2005, stating that the Bush Administration had specifically diverted tens of millions of US dollars in the Corps of Engineers from water and storm protection efforts to be used instead by the Corps in Iraq. As a result, Blumenthal said, the Corps had performed only last-minute and substandard reinforcement of levees, some of which subsequently failed. In February 2005, following in the tradition of past presidents, President Bush proposed cutting the Corps' budget by 7%, and in 2004 proposed a 13% cut.

Other questions have been raised about the design of the flood protection system itself. While the Corps has admitted fault for the failure of the 17th Street, London Avenue and Orleans Avenue outfall Canals, reports by the National Science Foundation/U.C. Berkeley and Team Louisiana cite inadequate design throughout the entire levee system.

New Orleans' emergency operations chief, Terry Ebbert, who worked with Mayor Ray Nagin before the hurricane and was part of the decision team which delayed the evacuation of the city standing thousands in New Orleans was later cited saying, "This is a national disgrace. We can send massive amounts of aid to tsunami victims, but we can't bail out the city of New Orleans," referring to the US humanitarian relief for the 2004 Indian Ocean tsunami.

=== Federal wetlands policy ===
There has been criticism of the federal policy, since 2003, of again turning wetlands over to developers.

Louisiana has a long history, under both parties, of approving private developments in wetlands with consequent destruction of wetlands across coastal Louisiana. "Wetlands create friction and reduce high winds when hurricanes hit. They also absorb hurricane storm surges. Scientists estimate that every 2.7 miles [4.3 km] of wetlands absorbs one foot [30 cm] of storm surge."

The Bush Administration, contrary to campaign promises and a wetland protection policy maintained since 1990, ended federal wetlands protection.

According to scientist Robert Twilley, the effects of the storm surge that overcame New Orleans and the surrounding parishes would have been drastically reduced had wetlands been present.

== Political effects of population displacement ==
In the days following the evacuation of New Orleans, Reuters reported that "[i]nterviews with refugees in Houston, which is expecting many thousands of evacuees to remain, suggest that thousands of black people who lost everything and had no insurance will end up living in Texas or other U.S. states," and Forbes magazine notes that "those left homeless will take part in the biggest internal migration of people since the days of the Dust Bowl and the Great Depression."

This and other reports suggest that the hurricane will have demographic consequences, particularly in and around Louisiana. Prior to the hurricane, Louisiana was one of a handful of states projected by the U.S. Census department to become a minority-majority state within the next two decades. Because a majority of displaced Louisiana residents are black, this occurrence will likely be delayed in Louisiana, but accelerated in nearby Florida, Georgia and Texas.

Katrina's effects were felt in the 2006 New Orleans mayoral election due to less voters.

It has been noted that the displacement of a significant portion of African Americans from Louisiana is likely to shift the politics of that state in a more conservative direction. Louisiana lost one vote in the Electoral College following the 2010 U.S. census.

== Effects on the structure of government ==
=== FEMA funding and leadership ===
Many local emergency managers defended FEMA, pointing out that the Bush Administration has since 9/11 reduced the agency's budget, mission, and status. FEMA, which was elevated to cabinet-level status under Bill Clinton and later incorporated into the Department of Homeland Security, which placed high priority on counter-terrorism and disaster preparation. Some members of the International Association of Emergency Managers had predicted that FEMA could not adequately respond to a catastrophe due to the integration and staffing overlaps. President Bush was criticized for appointing Michael D. Brown as FEMA head. Prior to joining FEMA, Brown had no experience in disaster relief and had even been fired from his previous job as a supervisor of judging at the International Arabian Horse Association. After closer scrutiny prompted by FEMA's coordination efforts with local officials before Hurricane Katrina, it was found that Brown had "mis-represented" several of his credentials which lower staffers had not discovered when vetting him for presidential appointment to his position. FEMA funding was affected by Hurricane Katrina by the proposal and passage of the Pets Evacuation and Transportation Standards Act, which requires states seeking FEMA assistance to accommodate pets and service animals in their plans for evacuating residents facing disasters.

== Policy matters arising during the recovery ==
=== Reports of contract awards ===
Halliburton received reconstruction and damage assessment contracts for naval facilities in Mississippi and New Orleans affected by Katrina. Kellogg Brown & Root, a former subsidiary of Halliburton, is doing major repairs at Navy facilities along the Gulf Coast that were damaged by the hurricane. That work is being done under a $500 million contract with the Defense Department.

Other no-bid contracts were awarded to the Fluor Corporation, a disaster recovery specialist company based in southern California, and The Shaw Group of Baton Rouge, La. Shaw is a client of Joe M. Allbaugh, a consultant with extensive emergency disaster training and was a former FEMA director. Shaw's CEO was chairman of Louisiana's Democratic party at the time. On 2005-09-13, officials vowed investigation of possible fraud and waste. The Shaw Group disclosed, in its annual report filed on July 5, that it is the subject of what the company describes as an "informal inquiry" by the Securities and Exchange Commission, and as policy regarding any investigation, the SEC declined to comment. Federal securities class-action cases accused the Shaw Group and its executives of defrauding investors with misleading statements concerning the company's finances and management. According to the Wall Street Journal (9/12/05), other companies that had received no-bid cost-plus contracts included Bechtel National, the government services arm of Bechtel Corporation which would provide temporary housing, Denver-based CH2M Hill Cos. which would provide housing, and Kenyon Worldwide Disaster Management which would collect human remains. FEMA has primary responsibility for spending more than $50 billion in aid, 60 times its budget in 2003 in a relatively short time-frame to facilitate quick response to the disaster.

The Shaw Group, Inc., which won two federal rebuilding contracts, each worth $100 million, has a history of obtaining no-bid contracts through contacts to Democratic politicians in Louisiana. "Shaw's chief executive officer, Jim Bernhard "is the Founder, Chairman and Chief Executive Officer of The Shaw Group Inc., a Fortune 500 company," and chairman of the Louisiana Democratic Party. The Shaw group and Jim Bernhard is/was also a major supporter and contributor to Gov. Blanco and other Major Louisiana Democratic politicians.

Bernhard has since resigned as his position as the Louisiana as chairman of the Louisiana Democratic Party. Another Shaw executive, Jeff Jenkins, was the governor's campaign manager.

== Speculations for the cause of Hurricane Katrina ==
Many commentators immediately began discussing global warming in the wake of the hurricane, with increased debate that global warming significantly increases the number and intensity of extreme weather events. There have even been claims that the United Nations (UN) scientists responsible for the UN Global Warming report have categorically denied Global Warming had any impact on hurricane strength or frequency in the past fifty years, but these reports are usually based on opinion, with no peer-reviewed scientific evidence to back up the reports.

More fanciful speculations came from a few who held outspoken fundamentalist religious views, asserting the hurricane was divine retribution for any number of provocations, including politically charged issues such as the War in Iraq, U.S. pressure for the Israeli withdrawal from Gaza, and domestic issues such as abortion and tolerance for homosexuality.

== See also ==
- Disaster Recovery Personal Protection Act of 2006
