= Marion Leary =

American resuscitation science researcher

- Born: Philadelphia, Pennsylvania, US

Academic background
- Education: BSN, 2006, Thomas Jefferson University; MSN, MPH, University of Pennsylvania; PhD, University of Pennsylvania

Academic work
- Institutions: University of Pennsylvania School of Nursing; Perelman School of Medicine at the University of Pennsylvania

Marion Leary is the Director of Innovation at the University of Pennsylvania School of Nursing and an American resuscitation science researcher.

== Early life and education ==
Leary was born and raised in Philadelphia, Pennsylvania, US alongside her twin sister Jen. They both attended Catholic elementary school where they were bullied for being gay. She later described her eight years at the school as the "worst of her life." In her early 20s, Leary played women's professional football and recreational softball, leading to a string of head injuries. She played for the New York Sharks, then of the Women's Professional Football League, for their 2000 season.

Five years after graduating high school, Leary was inspired by an advertisement for a nurse researcher to pursue that as a career. She subsequently became the first member of her immediate family to go to college. Leary completed her Bachelor's of Nursing degree at Thomas Jefferson University and her Master's degree at the University of Pennsylvania. During her training as a nurse, she worked in the Medical Intensive Care Unit (MICU) full-time for a year and part-time for an additional three years.

In 2023, she graduated with a PhD degree at the University of Pennsylvania's School of Nursing focusing on innovation and human-centered design.

== Career ==
While working in the MICU, Leary was informed about a nurse research coordinator position with the Center for Resuscitation Science and subsequently joined the faculty at the University of Pennsylvania. While serving in this role, she founded Sink or Swim Philadelphia, a non-profit organization who raised funds to pay for medical expenses using social media and medical crowd-funding. She was also simultaneously promoted to assistant director of clinical research and co-founded Resuscor, LLC, a Penn UPstart company focusing on cardiac arrest and resuscitation science medical education, innovation, and technology.

Leary was eventually appointed the director of innovation research at the Center for Resuscitation Science in the Perelman School of Medicine and the innovation specialist in University of Pennsylvania School of Nursing's office of nursing. In 2017, Leary was named Geek of the Year by Geekadelphia, Generocity, and Technical.ly Philly. During the same year, her startup ImmERge Labs won $50,000 at the AppItUP Demo Day and joined the University City Science Center's Digital Health Accelerator. Their success was short-lived, however, as the company shut down in 2018.

In March 2019, Leary was appointed the School of Nursing's inaugural director of innovation. In this role, she was expected to design and execute programs, courses, and projects related to health and healthcare innovation and the use of human-centered design and design thinking through Penn Nursing's Office of Nursing Research. While also working as the Director of Innovation Research at the Center for Resuscitation Science, Leary and her team partnered with Laerdal Medical to create CPReality, a holographic application that shows virtual blood-flow. In 2019, she was recognized by The Philadelphia Inquirer as an Influencer of Healthcare in the category of Excellence in Innovation and in 2021 was named a Health Tech Influencer.

In 2020, just prior to the COVID-19 pandemic, Leary launched a podcast with her colleague Angelarosa DiDonato called Amplify Nursing. She also co-organized the Nursing Mutual Aid group and the Nurse Hack 4 Health virtual hackathon to "help solve COVID-19 healthcare challenges with technological solutions." Leary is also a co-founder and on the board of SONSIEL, the Society of Nurse Scientists, Innovators, Entrepreneurs, and Leaders, and on the American Nurses Associations' Innovation Advisory Board.

Leary was also a contributor to The Huffington Post and contributes to online news sites including Generocity and the American Nurses Association's American Nurse journal as a part of their Nurse Influencer segment, as well as to the Philadelphia Inquirer.

In May 2022 and 2023, Marion Leary was also selected as one of the most powerful LGBTQIA+ people in Pennsylvania by City & State PA.

== Personal life ==
Leary is a lesbian and is married with one daughter. Her twin sister Jen was a 2014 CNN Hero and founder of the Red Paw Emergency Relief Team.
