= Red Paw Emergency Relief Team =

Animal welfare organization in Philadelphia

Coordinates: 39.935604°N 75.184281°W

- Founded: 2011
- Founder: Jennifer Leary
- Type: 501(c)(3)
- Tax ID no.: 45-2973875
- Headquarters: 1328 S 24th Street; Philadelphia, PA 19146
- Region served: Philadelphia and southeastern Pennsylvania
- Key people: Lori Albright (COO and President)
- Revenue: Donations and grants
- Website: redpawemergencyreliefteam.org

Red Paw Emergency Relief Team is a Philadelphia-based nonprofit emergency service dedicated to helping pets displaced by house fires and other residential disasters. Their goal is to reunite pets with their families once they have recovered and reduce the number of animals surrendered to shelters due to sudden hardship. The team works with local chapters of the American Red Cross, fire departments, and other disaster relief organizations to provide search and rescue, emergency transport, veterinary care, shelter and supplies for affected pets, at no cost to their owners.

== History ==
Red Paw Emergency Relief Team was conceived as a pilot program to develop a new kind of emergency response resource for animals. In 2006, the United States Congress recognized the importance of including pets in mass disaster planning with the passage of the Pets Evacuation and Transportation Standards Act, but no similar provision exists for victims of smaller scale disasters at the household level.

Founder Jennifer Leary states that she was inspired to start Red Paw while a firefighter with the Philadelphia Fire Department after seeing how little help was available to pet owners in the aftermath of devastating house fires. Many local relief organizations offer temporary housing assistance for displaced people, but none include accommodations for pets. In particular, low income and uninsured families faced the difficult decision of leaving their pets behind in the ruined fire dwelling or surrendering them to animal control.

In 2011, Leary presented a proposal to the American Red Cross of Southeastern Pennsylvania for an emergency service that would respond with the Red Cross and other relief agencies on the scene of household disasters where pets were involved. After months of preparation, Red Paw officially launched on July 25, 2011, and had its first clients—a family with six pit bull terriers—in a matter of hours.

In spite of the Red Paw pilot being originally intended to serve Philadelphia exclusively, demand from surrounding suburban counties caused the group to expand quickly beyond the city limits.

For her efforts in establishing Red Paw, Leary was profiled by CNN as part of its CNN Heroes series in 2014.

In March 2014, Red Paw Emergency Relief Team was added to the Philadelphia Office of Emergency Management’s disaster plan.

On April 24, 2014, the Philadelphia City Council honored Leary with a resolution for the founding of Red Paw and the organization’s contributions to the community.

In the summer of 2014, the Office of Emergency Management requested Red Paw’s assistance to shelter neighborhood pets during the controlled implosion of the Philadelphia Housing Authority’s Queen Lane Apartments on September 13, 2014.

On April 13, 2015, the City of Philadelphia recognized Red Paw volunteers for National Volunteer Week.

In May 2015, Red Paw received a grant from NRG Energy subsidiary NRG Home for a new lead response vehicle.

On April 10, 2016, the Philadelphia Office of Emergency Management declared Red Paw its "volunteers of the week" for National Volunteer Week.

== Services ==
Red Paw Emergency Relief Team is a volunteer-based organization that responds 24/7, 365 days a year. It operates mainly in the Pennsylvania counties of Philadelphia, Bucks, Montgomery, Chester, and Delaware, with some services extended to neighboring counties and states in the Philadelphia metropolitan area.

Red Paw is called when residents with pets are displaced by a disaster affecting their home, such as fire, flood, collapse, explosion, natural gas or carbon monoxide leak, or other hazardous incident. The team provides search and rescue, emergency transportation and veterinary care for injured animals, and temporary boarding assistance.

While in Red Paw care, animals receive wellness exams, vaccinations, and spay/neuter services, free of charge. Pets are then placed with volunteer fosters until they can be reunited with their owners.

For specialist services, the team maintains partnerships with animal care providers—including veterinary hospitals, kennels, boarding and training facilities—in every county that it serves.

In addition to providing emergency relief, Red Paw conducts volunteer training and public outreach and participates in fire safety and animal welfare events. The organization makes extensive use of social media to report its activities, promote emergency preparedness, fund raise, and recruit volunteers.

== Governance ==
A 501(c)(3) charitable organization, Red Paw Emergency Relief Team is funded through donations and grants. The team's leadership consists of two full-time staff and seven volunteer coordinators, who manage client and animal casework, fostering, adoptions, in-kind donations and events. Two per-diem emergency responders perform search and rescue and transport animals from the disaster scene. Red Paw's eleven-member advisory board is composed of representatives from the emergency services and animal welfare communities. A network of 500 volunteers train as emergency responders and support the team by fostering pets, staffing events, and transporting animals and supplies.
