= Stem Cell Therapeutic and Research Act of 2005 =

United States federal law

The Stem Cell Therapeutic and Research Act of 2005 (Pub. L. 109–129 (text) (PDF)) is a United States federal law that assigns the United States Secretary of Health and Human Services to create a national stockpile of cord blood stem cells, and rewrites provisions within the Public Health Service Act to account for cord blood and bone marrow donors.

== Legislative history ==
The House bill (HR-2520) was introduced on May 23, 2005, by Rep. Chris Smith of New Jersey. On December 20, 2005, the bill was signed by the President after passing through both chambers with unanimous consent.
