= Department of Homeland Security Appropriations Act, 2007 =

United States Law

The Department of Homeland Security Appropriations Act, 2007 (H.R. 5441) is a U.S. Act of Congress signed into law by President George W. Bush on October 4, 2006. The appropriation bill appropriates about $33.8 billion in homeland security funding, nearly $1.2 billion of which will go towards fencing off the southwest border of the United States as well as other barriers and technology to prevent illegal immigration.
