= Media coverage of Hurricane Katrina =

Due to the loss of most means of communication, such as land-based and cellular telephone systems, field reporters, journalists, editors and staffers, in many cases, became conduits for information between survivors and authorities. For their efforts, many were honored with Pulitzer prizes in 2006. However, the dearth of methods of communication also fueled rumors being repeated in the media which traumatized survivors and slowed down the already slow disaster response.

== Media involvement ==
Reporting by print, radio and television in the immediate aftermath of Katrina was extremely difficult due to the severe damage to communications technology. Katrina's wind and water sliced up commination webs that journalists needed. "Electricity was out. Landlines and telephone switching stations were being submerged. Some cell phone towers had lost power; others had been knocked over." In this chaos, news crews sometimes became conduits for information about stranded survivors, locating victims and relaying their locations to rescue authorities. An example is when Shepard Smith and Geraldo Rivera of Fox News, among others, reported thousands of people stranded at the Ernest N. Morial Convention Center.

For some, the hurricane was a career-defining event. For example, a Vanity Fair story qualified Brian Williams' (of NBC) work regarding Katrina as “Murrow-worthy” and reported that during the hurricane he became “a nation’s anchor.” Later, questions were raised about this reporting by a French Quarter hotel manager.

Media reporting also included coverage of political and religious leaders who suggested that the hurricane which killed 1,836 people was sent as a divine retribution for the sins of New Orleans, or of the South, or for the United States as a whole.

In the immediate aftermath, the local newspaper, the Times-Picayune could not be printed or distributed and so the NOLA.com news blog became the most utilized source for news on hurricane damage and recovery efforts. The site became an international focal point for news by local media, and also became a vital link for rescue operations. NOLA.com founder and managing editor Jon Donley turned over his NOLA View blog to his readers, who sent in dozens of calls for help. Those calls were relayed onto the blog, which was monitored constantly by rescuers, who then sent in teams to save them. NOLA.com was also used by displaced New Orleans residents who were "checking it literally almost every hour" for details.

In the weeks and months after the storm, there was also a dramatic rise in citizen journalism.

In September 2022, the Associated Press issued a style guide change to Katrina stating that reporters when writing about the storm in New Orleans should note that “…levee failures played a major role in the devastation in New Orleans. In some stories, that can be as simple as including a phrase about Hurricane Katrina’s catastrophic levee failures and flooding….”

== Award winning coverage ==
Staff of New Orleans Times-Picayune at Pulitzer Award Ceremony. May 22, 2006

The Times-Picayune was awarded the Breaking News Pulitzer Prize, and shared the Public Service Pulitzer with the Biloxi-based Sun Herald. The aggregation of community journalism, user photos and the use of the internet site as a collaborative response to the storm attracted international attention, and was called a watershed moment in journalism. In the wake of these online-only efforts, the Pulitzer Committee for the first time opened all its categories to online entries.

== Criticism ==
Some journalists repeated unsubstantiated rumors of mayhem which helped slow an already slow response. For example, exaggerated reports scared away truck and bus drivers who could have furnished people with much-needed supplies. A few of the reports of rape and violence were based on statements made by New Orleans city officials, including the Chief of Police. Only one actual report of a raping occurred during the uproar. The rumors also were seen as traumatizing an already wounded population that heard the rumors on their transistor radios. The Select Bipartisan Committee Report published in February 2006 acknowledged that the near-total destruction of communications infrastructure made television the role of first informer for the military and the general public. However the committee believed that those chaotic circumstances made accurate reporting even more important. They wrote, "Skepticism and fact-checking are easier when the sea is calm, but more vital when it is not."

In addition, there were some issues of racial bias in media coverage began to surface as Caucasian flood victims were portrayed in one Agence France-Presse photo as "finding" supplies, while a black person was described in an Associated Press photo as "looting" supplies. The photographers later clarified the two stories, one claiming he witnessed the black person looting a flooded store, while the other photographer described the white people as finding the food floating in floodwaters. The image was widely reused on the internet in various modified forms, and was known as "Lootie". This was also criticized as an example of pervasive racism.

== Restrictions on the media ==
As the U.S. military and rescue services regained control over the city, there were restrictions on the activity of the media.

On September 9, Lt. Gen. Russel L. Honoré, the military leader of the relief effort, announced that reporters would have "zero access" to efforts to recover bodies in New Orleans. Journalist Brian Williams also reported that in the process of blocking journalists, police even went so far as to threaten reporters with a weapon. However, at refugee centers such as the Houston Astrodome, press activity was extensive. Immediately following the government decision, CNN filed a lawsuit and obtained a temporary restraining order against the federal ban. The next day, spokesperson Col. Christian E. deGraff announced that the government would no longer attempt to bar media access to the victim recovery efforts.

On September 7, KATU journalist Brian Barker reported that his team was threatened with automatic weapons by U.S. Marshals until they were identified by Brig. Gen. Doug Pritt, commander of the 41st Brigade Combat Team of Oregon, the unit they were embedded with. Subsequently, his team taped the letters "TV" on the side of their vehicles in accordance with standard practice in war zones.

Toronto Star staff photojournalist Lucas Oleniuk was thrown to the ground by police in the French Quarter after taking several photographs, including pictures of a firefight between looters and police and the subsequent alleged beating of a looter by the police. The police attempted to take all of his equipment, however he convinced them to just take his camera's memory cards. In a separate incident, freelance photojournalist Marko Georgiev took photos of a body presumably shot and killed by the police. Police then pointed their weapons at the car and ordered the journalists out. They proceeded to search the car and confiscated one of Georgiev's memory cards.
