= Milvirtha Hendricks =

Hurricane Katrina survivor (1920–2009)

Milvirtha Knight Hendricks (February 27, 1920 – July 20, 2009) was an African American woman who, on September 1, 2005, was photographed by Eric Gay of the Associated Press outside the Ernest N. Morial Convention Center huddled in one of several American flag blankets given to her and to several other disaster victims, two days after Hurricane Katrina devastated New Orleans. This photograph and another image taken of her by a Los Angeles reporter became iconic symbols of the Katrina survivors.

== Life ==
Hendricks was born in 1920 in Louisiana. A widow, she and her husband raised 10 children primarily on his laborer's wages.

Hendricks lived with her daughter on Tennessee Avenue in the Lower Ninth Ward, just a few blocks from the Industrial Canal levee. She and her husband, James Hendricks, Sr., had bought their house in 1970.

== Hurricane Katrina and aftermath ==
Like 137,000 other citizens in New Orleans, she did not own or drive a car. As Hurricane Katrina drew closer to the Gulf Coast, the rising water forced her to evacuate to her son's home in New Orleans East; however, in boarding a rescue boat, she lost her belongings.

Milvirtha Hendricks resided in a Houston, Texas apartment after being reunited with her daughter. She had been temporarily evacuated to Arkansas. According to an August 28, 2006 article by AP reporters Allen G. Breed and Vicki Smith, who revisited Katrina survivors to mark the first anniversary of the disaster, the elderly Hendricks remembers almost nothing of her ordeal after losing her belongings.

== Later life and death ==
Hendricks spent the last of her years in relative peace and anonymity. She died in Houston on July 20, 2009 at the age of 89. Her body was brought back to New Orleans for funeral services and buried there. She is survived by seven of her ten children.
