= Pets Evacuation and Transportation Standards Act =

United States federal law

- Long title: To amend the Robert T. Stafford Disaster Relief and Emergency Assistance Act to ensure that State and local emergency preparedness operational plans address the needs of individuals with household pets and service animals following a major disaster or emergency
- Acronyms (colloquial): PETS
- Nicknames: PETS Act
- Enacted by: the 109th United States Congress

Citations
- Public law: Pub. L. 109–308 (text) (PDF)
- Statutes at Large: 120 Stat. 1725

Codification
- Acts amended: Robert T. Stafford Disaster Relief and Emergency Assistance Act
- Titles amended: Title 42 of the United States Code: The Public Health and Welfare

Legislative history
- Introduced in the House as H.R. 3858 by Rep. Tom Lantos D‑CA on September 22, 2005; Committee consideration by House Transportation and Infrastructure; Senate Homeland Security and Governmental Affairs; Passed the House on May 22, 2006 (349–24); Passed the Senate on August 4, 2006 (Unanimous consent); Agreed to by the House on September 20, 2006 (Voice vote); Signed into law by President George W. Bush on October 6, 2006

The Pets Evacuation and Transportation Standards Act (PETS) was a bi-partisan initiative in the United States House of Representatives to require states seeking Federal Emergency Management Agency (FEMA) assistance to accommodate pets and service animals in their plans for evacuating residents facing disasters. For pets that are not service animals, states must still follow the laws regarding service animals during a disaster.

Introduced by Congressmen Tom Lantos (D‑CA) and Christopher Shays (R‑CT) on September 22, 2005, the bill passed the House of Representatives on May 22, 2006, by a margin of 349 to 29. Technically an amendment to the Stafford Act, it was signed into law by President George W. Bush on October 6, 2006. The bill is now Public Law 109-308.

== Background ==
The bill was initiated in the aftermath of Hurricane Katrina when the abandonment of many thousands of pets and other animals brought the matter of animal welfare to national attention. In the aftermath of Hurricane Katrina, the Bush administration conducted a review of public relief efforts and where the infrastructure in place at the time failed. The Pets Evacuation and Transportation Standards Act served as an amendment to section 403 of Robert T. Stafford Disaster Relief and Emergency Assistance Act which had been in place since November 23, 1988 with no previous amendments. PETS was put in place to ensure that upon major disaster or emergency, FEMA has authorization to give shelter and care to people with service animals as well as household pets. Two other documents were involved in the activation of the PETS Act. These documents were Post Katrina Emergency Management Reform Act and National Response Framework. The PKERA made FEMA the sole agency responsible for national emergency response, while the National Response Framework was used to identify how the national government, along with communities and states would execute well coordinated national responses to disasters and emergencies. PERKA was signed into law August 3, 2006. National Response Framework amendments were finished October 4, 2006. To determine when the PETS Act would be activated, FEMA developed a policy titled Eligible Costs Related to Pet Evacuations and Sheltering. This policy operationally defined the terms household pet, service animal, and congregate household pet shelter. The policy states that only local and state governments are eligible to participate in the rescue and shelter of pets for reimbursement. The policy also states that private nonprofit groups can not be reimbursed directly. The bill's primary proposer, Tom Lantos, indicated that a press picture of a child being separated from his dog was the bill's catalyst; "The dog was taken away from this little boy, and to watch his face was a singularly revealing and tragic experience. This legislation was born at that moment." On the congressional record for the bill, he explained more fully:

The scene from New Orleans of a 9-year-old little boy crying because he was not allowed to take his little white dog Snowball was too much to bear. Personally, I know I wouldn't have been able to leave my little white dog Masko to a fate of almost certain death. As I watched the images of the heartbreaking choices the gulf residents had to make, I was moved to find a way to prevent this from ever happening again.

=== Hurricane Katrina animals ===
Stories of abandoned pets after Katrina filled the media. The issue raised questions of class concern, as animal welfare activist noted in the Washington Post that some hotels who took in evacuees allowed customers to bring their pets, but those forced to rely on public assistance had no options.

One particular case that garnered widespread attention was that of "Snowball", a small white dog made famous by Associated Press' coverage of the evacuation of the New Orleans Louisiana Superdome. The authorities who assisted evacuees onto buses refused to allow pets to board. Foster reported that "Pets were not allowed on the bus, and when a police officer confiscated a little boy's dog, the child cried until he vomited. 'Snowball, snowball,' he cried."

The story of "Snowball" became a centerpiece in fundraising appeals by welfare organizations and various ad-hoc websites were created by people soliciting funds to help locate Snowball and reunite him with the boy. On September 6, 2005, USA Today reported that Terry Conger, a veterinarian and information officer for the Incident Command Center that coordinated animal rescue efforts in Louisiana, said state veterinary officers had confirmed that Snowball is safe in a Louisiana shelter and that his owner had been located in Texas. However, it appears the veterinarian officials were mistaken. On September 10, 2005, the Lexington Herald-Leader quoted Conger as saying that original reports of Snowball's recovery were inaccurate and that "the chances of finding it [Snowball] and returning it to its owner are next to nil".

== Opposition ==
While the bill received wide support, it did have opponents. Two Representatives from the State of Georgia who opposed, Lynn Westmoreland-(R) and Charlie Norwood-(R), announced through spokesmen concerns that the law would unfairly impose federal control over state governance and negatively impact resources from other areas of emergency planning necessary to protect human lives.

== See also ==
- Animal law
- Social effects of Hurricane Katrina
