= List of acts of the 109th United States Congress =

The acts of the 109th United States Congress includes all Acts of Congress and ratified treaties by the 109th United States Congress, which lasted from January 3, 2005 to January 3, 2007

Acts include public and private laws, which are enacted after being passed by Congress and signed by the President, however if the President vetoes a bill it can still be enacted by a two-thirds vote in both houses. The Senate alone considers treaties, which are ratified by a two-thirds vote.

== Summary of actions ==
President George W. Bush vetoed the Stem Cell Research Enhancement Act of 2005 during this Congress. This bill was not enacted by Congress over the President's veto.

== Public laws ==
Public law number (Linked to Wikisource)	Date of enactment	Official short title(s)	Official description	Link to Legislink.org
109-1	January 7, 2005	(No short title)	An act to accelerate the income tax benefits for charitable cash contributions for the relief of victims of the Indian Ocean tsunami	Pub. L. 109–1 (text) (PDF)
109-2	February 18, 2005	Class Action Fairness Act of 2005	An act to amend the procedures that apply to consideration of interstate class actions to assure fairer outcomes for class members and defendants, and for other purposes	Pub. L. 109–2 (text) (PDF)
109-3	March 21, 2005	(No short title)	An act for the relief of the parents of Theresa Marie Schiavo	Pub. L. 109–3 (text) (PDF)
109-4	March 25, 2005	Welfare Reform Extension Act of 2005	An act to reauthorize the Temporary Assistance for Needy Families block grant program through June 30, 2005, and for other purposes	Pub. L. 109–4 (text) (PDF)
109-5	March 25, 2005	(No short title)	An act to extend the existence of the Nazi War Crimes and Japanese Imperial Government Records Interagency Working Group for 2 years	Pub. L. 109–5 (text) (PDF)
109-6	March 31, 2005	(No short title)	An act to amend the Internal Revenue Code of 1986 to extend the Leaking Underground Storage Tank Trust Fund financing rate	Pub. L. 109–6 (text) (PDF)
109-7	April 15, 2005	(No short title)	An act to amend the Internal Revenue Code of 1986 to provide for the proper tax treatment of certain disaster mitigation payments	Pub. L. 109–7 (text) (PDF)
109-8	April 20, 2005	Bankruptcy Abuse Prevention and Consumer Protection Act of 2005	An act to amend title 11 of the United States Code, and for other purposes	Pub. L. 109–8 (text) (PDF)
109-9	April 27, 2005	Family Entertainment and Copyright Act of 2005	An act to provide for the protection of intellectual property rights, and for other purposes	Pub. L. 109–9 (text) (PDF)
109-10	April 29, 2005	(No short title)	An act to designate the United States courthouse located at 501 I Street in Sacramento, California, as the "Robert T. Matsui United States Courthouse"	Pub. L. 109–10 (text) (PDF)
109-11	May 5, 2005	(No short title)	Joint resolution providing for the appointment of Shirley Ann Jackson as a citizen regent of the Board of Regents of the Smithsonian Institution	Pub. L. 109–11 (text) (PDF)
109-12	May 5, 2005	(No short title)	Joint resolution providing for the appointment of Robert P. Kogod as a citizen regent of the Board of Regents of the Smithsonian Institution	Pub. L. 109–12 (text) (PDF)
109-13	May 11, 2005	Emergency Supplemental Appropriations Act for Defense, the Global War on Terror, and Tsunami Relief, 2005	An act making Emergency Supplemental Appropriations for Defense, the Global War on Terror, and Tsunami Relief, for the fiscal year ending September 30, 2005, and for other purposes	Pub. L. 109–13 (text) (PDF)
109-14	May 31, 2005	Surface Transportation Extension Act of 2005	An act to provide an extension of highway, highway safety, motor carrier safety, transit, and other programs funded out of the Highway Trust Fund pending enactment of a law reauthorizing the Transportation Equity Act for the 21st Century	Pub. L. 109–14 (text) (PDF)
109-15	June 17, 2005	(No short title)	An act to designate the facility of the United States Postal Service located at 215 Martin Luther King, Jr. Boulevard in Madison, Wisconsin, as the "Robert M. La Follette, Sr. Post Office Building"	Pub. L. 109–15 (text) (PDF)
109-16	June 29, 2005	(No short title)	An act to designate a United States courthouse in Brownsville, Texas, as the "Reynaldo G. Garza and Filemon B. Vela United States Courthouse"	Pub. L. 109–16 (text) (PDF)
109-17	June 29, 2005	(No short title)	An act to amend the Agricultural Credit Act of 1987 to reauthorize State mediation programs	Pub. L. 109–17 (text) (PDF)
109-18	June 29, 2005	Patient Navigator Outreach and Chronic Disease Prevention Act of 2005	An act to amend the Public Health Service Act to authorize a demonstration grant program to provide patient navigator services to reduce barriers and improve health care outcomes, and for other purposes	Pub. L. 109–18 (text) (PDF)
109-19	July 1, 2005	TANF Extension Act of 2005	An act to reauthorize the Temporary Assistance for Needy Families block grant program through September 30, 2005, and for other purposes	Pub. L. 109–19 (text) (PDF)
109-20	July 1, 2005	Surface Transportation Extension Act of 2005, Part II	An act to provide an extension of highway, highway safety, motor carrier safety, transit, and other programs funded out of the Highway Trust Fund pending enactment of a law reauthorizing the Transportation Equity Act for the 21st Century	Pub. L. 109–20 (text) (PDF)
109-21	July 9, 2005	Junk Fax Prevention Act of 2005	An act to amend section 227 of the Communications Act of 1934 (47 U.S.C. § 227) relating to the prohibition on junk fax transmissions	Pub. L. 109–21 (text) (PDF)
109-22	July 12, 2005	(No short title)	An act to designate the facility of the United States Postal Service located at 30777 Rancho California Road in Temecula, California, as the "Dalip Singh Saund Post Office Building"	Pub. L. 109–22 (text) (PDF)
109-23	July 12, 2005	(No short title)	An act to designate the facility of the United States Postal Service located at 8200 South Vermont Avenue in Los Angeles, California, as the "Sergeant First Class John Marshall Post Office Building"	Pub. L. 109–23 (text) (PDF)
109-24	July 12, 2005	(No short title)	An act to designate the facility of the United States Postal Service located at 321 Montgomery Road in Altamonte Springs, Florida, as the "Arthur Stacey Mastrapa Post Office Building"	Pub. L. 109–24 (text) (PDF)
109-25	July 12, 2005	(No short title)	An act to designate the facility of the United States Postal Service located at 4960 West Washington Boulevard in Los Angeles, California, as the "Ray Charles Post Office Building"	Pub. L. 109–25 (text) (PDF)
109-26	July 12, 2005	(No short title)	An act to designate the facility of the United States Postal Service located at 40 Putnam Avenue in Hamden, Connecticut, as the "Linda White-Epps Post Office"	Pub. L. 109–26 (text) (PDF)
109-27	July 12, 2005	(No short title)	An act to designate the facility of the United States Postal Service located at 151 West End Street in Goliad, Texas, as the "Judge Emilio Vargas Post Office Building"	Pub. L. 109–27 (text) (PDF)
109-28	July 12, 2005	(No short title)	An act to designate the facility of the United States Postal Service located at 120 East Illinois Avenue in Vinita, Oklahoma, as the "Francis C. Goodpaster Post Office Building"	Pub. L. 109–28 (text) (PDF)
109-29	July 12, 2005	(No short title)	An act to designate the facility of the United States Postal Service located at 750 4th Street in Sparks, Nevada, as the "Mayor Tony Armstrong Memorial Post Office"	Pub. L. 109–29 (text) (PDF)
109-30	July 12, 2005	(No short title)	An act to designate the facility of the United States Postal Service located at 6200 Rolling Road in Springfield, Virginia, as the "Captain Mark Stubenhofer Post Office Building"	Pub. L. 109–30 (text) (PDF)
109-31	July 12, 2005	(No short title)	An act to designate the facility of the United States Postal Service located at 12433 Antioch Road in Overland Park, Kansas, as the "Ed Eilert Post Office Building"	Pub. L. 109–31 (text) (PDF)
109-32	July 12, 2005	(No short title)	An act to designate the facility of the United States Postal Service located at 695 Pleasant Street in New Bedford, Massachusetts, as the "Honorable Judge George N. Leighton Post Office Building"	Pub. L. 109–32 (text) (PDF)
109-33	July 12, 2005	(No short title)	An act to designate the facility of the United States Postal Service located at 614 West Old County Road in Belhaven, North Carolina, as the "Floyd Lupton Post Office"	Pub. L. 109–33 (text) (PDF)
109-34	July 12, 2005	(No short title)	An act to amend the Communications Satellite Act of 1962 to strike the privatization criteria for Intelsat separated entities, remove certain restrictions on separated and successor entities to Intelsat, and for other purposes	Pub. L. 109–34 (text) (PDF)
109-35	July 20, 2005	Surface Transportation Extension Act of 2005, Part III	An act to provide an extension of highway, highway safety, motor carrier safety, transit, and other programs funded out of the Highway Trust Fund pending enactment of a law reauthorizing the Transportation Equity Act for the 21st Century	Pub. L. 109–35 (text) (PDF)
109-36	July 21, 2005	(No short title)	An act to designate the facility of the United States Postal Service located at 301 South Heatherwilde Boulevard in Pflugerville, Texas, as the "Sergeant Byron W. Norwood Post Office Building"	Pub. L. 109–36 (text) (PDF)
109-37	July 22, 2005	Surface Transportation Extension Act of 2005, Part IV	An act to provide an extension of highway, highway safety, motor carrier safety, transit, and other programs funded out of the Highway Trust Fund pending enactment of a law reauthorizing the Transportation Equity Act for the 21st Century	Pub. L. 109–37 (text) (PDF)
109-38	July 27, 2005	(No short title)	An act to permit the individuals currently serving as executive director, deputy executive directors, and general counsel of the Office of Compliance to serve one additional term	Pub. L. 109–38 (text) (PDF)
109-39	July 27, 2005	(No short title)	Joint resolution approving the renewal of import restrictions contained in the Burmese Freedom and Democracy Act of 2003	Pub. L. 109–39 (text) (PDF)
109-40	July 28, 2005	Surface Transportation Extension Act of 2005, Part V	An act to provide an extension of highway, highway safety, motor carrier safety, transit, and other programs funded out of the Highway Trust Fund pending enactment of a law reauthorizing the Transportation Equity Act for the 21st Century	Pub. L. 109–40 (text) (PDF)
109-41	July 29, 2005	Patient Safety and Quality Improvement Act of 2005	An act to amend title IX of the Public Health Service Act to provide for the improvement of patient safety and to reduce the incidence of events that adversely effect patient safety	Pub. L. 109–41 (text) (PDF)
109-42	July 30, 2005	Surface Transportation Extension Act of 2005, Part VI	An act to provide an extension of administrative expenses for highway, highway safety, motor carrier safety, transit, and other programs funded out of the Highway Trust Fund pending enactment of a law reauthorizing the Transportation Equity Act for the 21st Century	Pub. L. 109–42 (text) (PDF)
109-43	August 1, 2005	Medical Device User Fee Stabilization Act of 2005	An act to amend the Federal Food, Drug, and Cosmetic Act with respect to medical device user fees	Pub. L. 109–43 (text) (PDF)
109-44	August 2, 2005	Upper White Salmon Wild and Scenic Rivers Act	An act to designate a portion of the White Salmon River as a component of the National Wild and Scenic Rivers System	Pub. L. 109–44 (text) (PDF)
109-45	August 2, 2005	Sand Creek Massacre National Historic Site Trust Act of 2005	An act to further the purposes of the Sand Creek Massacre National Historic Site Establishment Act of 2000	Pub. L. 109–45 (text) (PDF)
109-46	August 2, 2005	(No short title)	An act to direct the Secretary of Agriculture to convey certain land to Lander County, Nevada, and the Secretary of the Interior to convey certain land to Eureka County, Nevada, for continued use as cemeteries	Pub. L. 109–46 (text) (PDF)
109-47	August 2, 2005	Colorado River Indian Reservation Boundary Correction Act	An act to correct the south boundary of the Colorado River Indian Reservation in Arizona, and for other purposes	Pub. L. 109–47 (text) (PDF)
109-48	August 2, 2005	(No short title)	An act to authorize the Secretary of the Interior to contract with the city of Cheyenne, Wyoming, for the storage of the city's water in the Kendrick Project, Wyoming	Pub. L. 109–48 (text) (PDF)
109-49	August 2, 2005	(No short title)	Joint resolution expressing the sense of Congress with respect to the women suffragists who fought for and won the right of women to vote in the United States	Pub. L. 109–49 (text) (PDF)
109-50	August 2, 2005	(No short title)	An act to designate the facility of the United States Postal Service located at 1915 Fulton Street in Brooklyn, New York, as the "Congresswoman Shirley A. Chisholm Post Office Building"	Pub. L. 109–50 (text) (PDF)
109-51	August 2, 2005	(No short title)	An act to designate the facility of the United States Postal Service located at 123 W. 7th Street in Holdenville, Oklahoma, as the "Boone Pickens Post Office"	Pub. L. 109–51 (text) (PDF)
109-52	August 2, 2005	(No short title)	An act to designate the facility of the United States Postal Service located at 1560 Union Valley Road in West Milford, New Jersey, as the "Brian P. Parrello Post Office Building"	Pub. L. 109–52 (text) (PDF)
109-53	August 2, 2005	Dominican Republic-Central America-United States Free Trade Agreement Implementation Act	An act to implement the Dominican Republic-Central America-United States Free Trade Agreement	Pub. L. 109–53 (text) (PDF)
109-54	August 2, 2005	Department of the Interior, Environment, and Related Agencies Appropriations Act, 2006	An act making appropriations for the Department of the Interior, environment, and related agencies for the fiscal year ending September 30, 2006, and for other purposes	Pub. L. 109–54 (text) (PDF)
109-55	August 2, 2005	Legislative Branch Appropriations Act, 2006	An act making appropriations for the Legislative Branch for the fiscal year ending September 30, 2006, and for other purposes	Pub. L. 109–55 (text) (PDF)
109-56	August 2, 2005	(No short title)	An act to amend the Controlled Substances Act to lift the patient limitation on prescribing drug addiction treatments by medical practitioners in group practices, and for other purposes	Pub. L. 109–56 (text) (PDF)
109-57	August 2, 2005	(No short title)	An act to amend the Controlled Substances Import and Export Act to provide authority for the Attorney General to authorize the export of controlled substances from the United States to another country for subsequent export from that country to a second country, if certain conditions and safeguards are satisfied	Pub. L. 109–57 (text) (PDF)
109-58	August 8, 2005	Federal Nonnuclear Energy Research and Development Act of 1974	An act to ensure jobs for our future with secure, affordable, and reliable energy	Pub. L. 109–58 (text) (PDF)
109-59	August 10, 2005	Safe, Accountable, Flexible, Efficient Transportation Equity Act: A Legacy for Users	An act to authorize funds for Federal-aid highways, highway safety programs, and transit programs, and for other purposes	Pub. L. 109–59 (text) (PDF)
109-60	August 11, 2005	National All Schedules Prescription Electronic Reporting Act of 2005	An act to provide for the establishment of a controlled substance monitoring program in each State	Pub. L. 109–60 (text) (PDF)
109-61	September 2, 2005	Emergency Supplemental Appropriations Act to Meet Immediate Needs Arising From the Consequences of Hurricane Katrina, 2005	An act making emergency supplemental appropriations to meet immediate needs arising from the consequences of Hurricane Katrina, for the fiscal year ending September 30, 2005, and for other purposes	Pub. L. 109–61 (text) (PDF)
109-62	September 8, 2005	Second Emergency Supplemental Appropriations Act to Meet Immediate Needs Arising From the Consequences of Hurricane Katrina, 2005	An act making further emergency supplemental appropriations to meet immediate needs arising from the consequences of Hurricane Katrina, for the fiscal year ending September 30, 2005, and for other purposes	Pub. L. 109–62 (text) (PDF)
109-63	September 9, 2005	Federal Judiciary Emergency Special Sessions Act of 2005	An act to allow United States courts to conduct business during emergency conditions, and for other purposes	Pub. L. 109–63 (text) (PDF)
109-64	September 20, 2005	(No short title)	An act to exclude from consideration as income certain payments under the national flood insurance program	Pub. L. 109–64 (text) (PDF)
109-65	September 20, 2005	National Flood Insurance Program Enhanced Borrowing Authority Act of 2005	An act to temporarily increase the borrowing authority of the Federal Emergency Management Agency for carrying out the national flood insurance program	Pub. L. 109–65 (text) (PDF)
109-66	September 21, 2005	Pell Grant Hurricane and Disaster Relief Act	An act to provide the Secretary of Education with waiver authority for students who are eligible for Pell Grants who are adversely affected by a natural disaster	Pub. L. 109–66 (text) (PDF)
109-67	September 21, 2005	Student Grant Hurricane and Disaster Relief Act	An act to provide the Secretary of Education with waiver authority for students who are eligible for Federal student grant assistance who are adversely affected by a major disaster	Pub. L. 109–67 (text) (PDF)
109-68	September 21, 2005	TANF Emergency Response and Recovery Act of 2005	An act to provide assistance to families affected by Hurricane Katrina, through the program of block grants to States for temporary assistance for needy families	Pub. L. 109–68 (text) (PDF)
109-69	September 21, 2005	Dandini Research Park Conveyance Act	An act to direct the Secretary of the Interior to convey certain land in Washoe County, Nevada, to the Board of Regents of the University and Community College System of Nevada	Pub. L. 109–69 (text) (PDF)
109-70	September 21, 2005	Hawaii Water Resources Act of 2005	An act to amend the Reclamation Wastewater and Groundwater Study and Facilities Act to authorize certain projects in the State of Hawaii	Pub. L. 109–70 (text) (PDF)
109-71	September 21, 2005	Wind Cave National Park Boundary Revision Act of 2005	An act to revise the boundary of the Wind Cave National Park in the State of South Dakota	Pub. L. 109–71 (text) (PDF)
109-72	September 23, 2005	Flexibility for Displaced Workers Act	An act to provide special rules for disaster relief employment under the Workforce Investment Act of 1998 for individuals displaced by Hurricane Katrina	Pub. L. 109–72 (text) (PDF)
109-73	September 23, 2005	(No short title)	An act to provide emergency tax relief for persons affected by Hurricane Katrina	Pub. L. 109–73 (text) (PDF)
109-74	September 29, 2005	Sportfishing and Recreational Boating Safety Amendments Act of 2005	An act to ensure funding for sportfishing and boating safety programs funded out of the Highway Trust Fund through the end of fiscal year 2005, and for other purposes	Pub. L. 109–74 (text) (PDF)
109-75	September 29, 2005	(No short title)	An act to amend the Pittman-Robertson Wildlife Restoration Act to extend the date after which surplus funds in the wildlife restoration fund become available for apportionment	Pub. L. 109–75 (text) (PDF)
109-76	September 29, 2005	United States Parole Commission Extension and Sentencing Commission Authority Act of 2005	An act to extend the existence of the Parole Commission, and for other purposes	Pub. L. 109–76 (text) (PDF)
109-77	September 30, 2005	(No short title)	Joint resolution making continuing appropriations for the fiscal year 2006, and for other purposes	Pub. L. 109–77 (text) (PDF)
109-78	September 30, 2005	(No short title)	An act to extend the waiver authority of the Secretary of Education with respect to student financial assistance during a war or other military operation or national emergency	Pub. L. 109–78 (text) (PDF)
109-79	September 30, 2005	(No short title)	An act to extend by 10 years the authority of the Secretary of Commerce to conduct the quarterly financial report program	Pub. L. 109–79 (text) (PDF)
109-80	September 30, 2005	Servicemembers' Group Life Insurance Enhancement Act of 2005	An act to amend title 38, United States Code, to enhance the Servicemembers' Group Life Insurance program, and for other purposes	Pub. L. 109–80 (text) (PDF)
109-81	September 30, 2005	Higher Education Extension Act of 2005	An act to temporarily extend the programs under the Higher Education Act of 1965, and for other purposes	Pub. L. 109–81 (text) (PDF)
109-82	September 30, 2005	Assistance for Individuals with Disabilities Affected by Hurricane Katrina or Rita Act of 2005	An act to assist individuals with disabilities affected by Hurricane Katrina or Rita through vocational rehabilitation services	Pub. L. 109–82 (text) (PDF)
109-83	September 30, 2005	(No short title)	An act to amend the United States Grain Standards Act to reauthorize that Act	Pub. L. 109–83 (text) (PDF)
109-84	October 4, 2005	(No short title)	An act to designate the facility of the United States Postal Service located at 200 South Barrington Street in Los Angeles, California, as the "Karl Malden Station"	Pub. L. 109–84 (text) (PDF)
109-85	October 4, 2005	(No short title)	An act to designate the facility of the United States Postal Service located at 2600 Oak Street in St. Charles, Illinois, as the "Jacob L. Frazier Post Office Building"	Pub. L. 109–85 (text) (PDF)
109-86	October 7, 2005	Natural Disaster Student Aid Fairness Act	An act to provide the Secretary of Education with waiver authority for the reallocation rules in the Campus-Based Aid programs, and to extend the deadline by which funds have to be reallocated to institutions of higher education due to a natural disaster	Pub. L. 109–86 (text) (PDF)
109-87	October 7, 2005	(No short title)	An act to authorize the Secretary of Transportation to make emergency airport improvement project grants-in-aid under title 49, United States Code, for repairs and costs related to damage from Hurricanes Katrina and Rita	Pub. L. 109–87 (text) (PDF)
109-88	October 7, 2005	Community Disaster Loan Act of 2005	An act to provide for community disaster loans	Pub. L. 109–88 (text) (PDF)
109-89	October 13, 2005	(No short title)	An act to redesignate the Crowne Plaza in Kingston, Jamaica as the Colin L. Powell Residential Plaza	Pub. L. 109–89 (text) (PDF)
109-90	October 18, 2005	Department of Homeland Security Appropriations Act, 2006	An act making appropriations for the Department of Homeland Security for the fiscal year ending September 30, 2006, and for other purposes	Pub. L. 109–90 (text) (PDF)
109-91	October 20, 2005	QI, TMA, and Abstinence Programs Extension and Hurricane Katrina Unemployment Relief Act of 2005	An act to extend medicare cost-sharing for qualifying individuals through September 2007, to extend transitional medical assistance and the program for abstinence education through December 2005, to provide unemployment relief for States and individuals affected by Hurricane Katrina, and for other purposes	Pub. L. 109–91 (text) (PDF)
109-92	October 26, 2005	Protection of Lawful Commerce in Arms Act	An act to prohibit civil liability actions from being brought or continued against manufacturers, distributors, dealers, or importers of firearms or ammunition for damages, injunctive or other relief resulting from the misuse of their products by others	Pub. L. 109–92 (text) (PDF)
109-93	October 26, 2005	Rocky Mountain National Park Boundary Adjustment Act of 2005	An act to adjust the boundary of Rocky Mountain National Park in the State of Colorado	Pub. L. 109–93 (text) (PDF)
109-94	October 26, 2005	Ojito Wilderness Act	An act to designate the Ojito Wilderness Study Area as wilderness, to take certain land into trust for the Pueblo of Zia, and for other purposes	Pub. L. 109–94 (text) (PDF)
109-95	November 8, 2005	Assistance for Orphans and Other Vulnerable Children in Developing Countries Act of 2005	An act to amend the Foreign Assistance Act of 1961 to provide assistance for orphans and other vulnerable children in developing countries, and for other purposes	Pub. L. 109–95 (text) (PDF)
109-96	November 9, 2005	(No short title)	An act to amend the Federal Food, Drug, and Cosmetic Act to provide for the regulation of all contact lenses as medical devices, and for other purposes	Pub. L. 109–96 (text) (PDF)
109-97	November 10, 2005	Agriculture, Rural Development, Food and Drug Administration, and Related Agencies Appropriations Act, 2006	An act making appropriations for Agriculture, Rural Development, Food and Drug Administration, and Related Agencies for the fiscal year ending September 30, 2006, and for other purposes	Pub. L. 109–97 (text) (PDF)
109-98	November 11, 2005	(No short title)	An act to designate the Federal building located at 333 Mt. Elliott Street in Detroit, Michigan, as the "Rosa Parks Federal Building"	Pub. L. 109–98 (text) (PDF)
109-99	November 11, 2005	(No short title)	An act to extend through March 31, 2006, the authority of the Secretary of the Army to accept and expend funds contributed by non-Federal public entities and to expedite the processing of permits	Pub. L. 109–99 (text) (PDF)
109-100	November 11, 2005	(No short title)	An act to extend the special postage stamp for breast cancer research for 2 years	Pub. L. 109–100 (text) (PDF)
109-101	November 11, 2005	(No short title)	An act to designate the Federal building located at 333 Mt. Elliott Street in Detroit, Michigan, as the "Rosa Parks Federal Building"	Pub. L. 109–101 (text) (PDF)
109-102	November 14, 2005	Foreign Operations, Export Financing, and Related Programs Appropriations Act, 2006	An act making appropriations for foreign operations, export financing, and related programs for the fiscal year ending September 30, 2006, and for other purposes	Pub. L. 109–102 (text) (PDF)
109-103	November 19, 2005	Energy and Water Development Appropriations Act, 2006	An act making appropriations for energy and water development for the fiscal year ending September 30, 2006, and for other purposes	Pub. L. 109–103 (text) (PDF)
109-104	November 19, 2005	(No short title)	An act to authorize the Secretary of the Navy to enter into a contract for the nuclear refueling and complex overhaul of the U.S.S. Carl Vinson (CVN-70)	Pub. L. 109–104 (text) (PDF)
109-105	November 19, 2005	(No short title)	Joint resolution making further continuing appropriations for the fiscal year 2006, and for other purposes	Pub. L. 109–105 (text) (PDF)
109-106	November 21, 2005	National Flood Insurance Program Further Enhanced Borrowing Authority Act of 2005	An act to temporarily increase the borrowing authority of the Federal Emergency Management Agency for carrying out the national flood insurance program	Pub. L. 109–106 (text) (PDF)
109-107	November 22, 2005	(No short title)	An act to designate the facility of the United States Postal Service located at 442 West Hamilton Street, Allentown, Pennsylvania, as the "Mayor Joseph S. Daddona Memorial Post Office"	Pub. L. 109–107 (text) (PDF)
109-108	November 22, 2005	Science, State, Justice, Commerce, and Related Agencies Appropriations Act, 2006	An act making appropriations for Science, the Departments of State, Justice, and Commerce, and related agencies for the fiscal year ending September 30, 2006, and for other purposes	Pub. L. 109–108 (text) (PDF)
109-109	November 22, 2005	(No short title)	An act to designate the facility of the United States Postal Service located at 2061 South Park Avenue in Buffalo, New York, as the "James T. Molloy Post Office Building"	Pub. L. 109–109 (text) (PDF)
109-110	November 22, 2005	Northern Arizona Land Exchange and Verde River Basin Partnership Act of 2005	An act to provide for a land exchange in the State of Arizona between the Secretary of Agriculture and Yavapai Ranch Limited Partnership	Pub. L. 109–110 (text) (PDF)
109-111	November 22, 2005	Veterans' Compensation Cost-of-Living Adjustment Act of 2005	An act to increase, effective as of December 1, 2005, the rates of compensation for veterans with service-connected disabilities and the rates of dependency and indemnity compensation for the survivors of certain disabled veterans	Pub. L. 109–111 (text) (PDF)
109-112	November 22, 2005	Iran Nonproliferation Amendments Act of 2005	An act to make amendments to the Iran Nonproliferation Act of 2000 related to International Space Station payments, and for other purposes	Pub. L. 109–112 (text) (PDF)
109-113	November 22, 2005	Fair Access Foster Care Act of 2005	An act to amend part E of title IV of the Social Security Act to provide for the making of foster care maintenance payments to private for-profit agencies	Pub. L. 109–113 (text) (PDF)
109-114	November 30, 2005	Military Quality of Life and Veterans Affairs Appropriations Act, 2006	An act making appropriations for military quality of life functions of the Department of Defense, military construction, the Department of Veterans Affairs, and related agencies for the fiscal year ending September 30, 2006, and for other purposes	Pub. L. 109–114 (text) (PDF)
109-115	November 30, 2005	(No short title)	An act making appropriations for the Departments of Transportation, Treasury, and Housing and Urban Development, the Judiciary, District of Columbia, and independent agencies for the fiscal year ending September 30, 2006, and for other purposes	Pub. L. 109–115 (text) (PDF)
109-116	December 1, 2005	(No short title)	An act to direct the Joint Committee on the Library to obtain a statue of Rosa Parks and to place the statue in the United States Capitol in National Statuary Hall, and for other purposes	Pub. L. 109–116 (text) (PDF)
109-117	December 1, 2005	(No short title)	An act to amend Public Law 89-366 to allow for an adjustment in the number of free roaming horses permitted in Cape Lookout National Seashore	Pub. L. 109–117 (text) (PDF)
109-118	December 1, 2005	Caribbean National Forest Act of 2005	An act to designate certain National Forest System land in the Commonwealth of Puerto Rico as a component of the National Wilderness Preservation System	Pub. L. 109–118 (text) (PDF)
109-119	December 1, 2005	Angel Island Immigration Station Restoration and Preservation Act	An act to authorize appropriations to the Secretary of the Interior for the restoration of the Angel Island Immigration Station in the State of California	Pub. L. 109–119 (text) (PDF)
109-120	December 1, 2005	Franklin National Battlefield Study Act	An act to direct the Secretary of the Interior to conduct a special resource study to determine the suitability and feasibility of including in the National Park System certain sites in Williamson County, Tennessee relating to the Battle of Franklin	Pub. L. 109–120 (text) (PDF)
109-121	December 1, 2005	Senator Paul Simon Water for the Poor Act of 2005	An act to make access to safe water and sanitation for developing countries a specific policy objective of the United States foreign assistance programs, and for other purposes	Pub. L. 109–121 (text) (PDF)
109-122	December 1, 2005	(No short title)	An act to designate the facility of the United States Postal Service located at 57 West Street in Newville, Pennsylvania, as the "Randall D. Shughart Post Office Building"	Pub. L. 109–122 (text) (PDF)
109-123	December 1, 2005	(No short title)	An act to designate the facility of the United States Postal Service located at 567 Tompkins Avenue in Staten Island, New York, as the "Vincent Palladino Post Office"	Pub. L. 109–123 (text) (PDF)
109-124	December 1, 2005	(No short title)	An act to designate the facility of the United States Postal Service located at 208 South Main Street in Parkdale, Arkansas, as the Willie Vaughn Post Office	Pub. L. 109–124 (text) (PDF)
109-125	December 7, 2005	Department of the Interior Volunteer Recruitment Act of 2005	An act to authorize the Secretary of the Interior to recruit volunteers to assist with, or facilitate, the activities of various agencies and offices of the Department of the Interior	Pub. L. 109–125 (text) (PDF)
109-126	December 7, 2005	(No short title)	An act to direct the Secretary of Interior to convey certain land held in trust for the Paiute Indian Tribe of Utah to the City of Richfield, Utah, and for other purposes	Pub. L. 109–126 (text) (PDF)
109-127	December 7, 2005	(No short title)	An act to revoke a Public Land Order with respect to certain lands erroneously included in the Cibola National Wildlife Refuge, California	Pub. L. 109–127 (text) (PDF)
109-128	December 18, 2005	(No short title)	Joint resolution making further continuing appropriations for the fiscal year 2006, and for other purposes	Pub. L. 109–128 (text) (PDF)
109-129	December 20, 2005	Stem Cell Therapeutic and Research Act of 2005	An act to provide for the collection and maintenance of human cord blood stem cells for the treatment of patients and research, and to amend the Public Health Service Act to authorize the C.W. Bill Young Cell Transplantation Program	Pub. L. 109–129 (text) (PDF)
109-130	December 20, 2005	(No short title)	An act to direct the Secretary of the Interior to convey a parcel of real property to Beaver County, Utah	Pub. L. 109–130 (text) (PDF)
109-131	December 20, 2005	(No short title)	An act to authorize the Secretary of the Interior to provide supplemental funding and other services that are necessary to assist certain local school districts in the State of California in providing educational services for students attending schools located within Yosemite National Park, to authorize the Secretary of the Interior to adjust the boundaries of the Golden Gate National Recreation Area, to adjust the boundaries of Redwood National Park, and for other purposes	Pub. L. 109–131 (text) (PDF)
109-132	December 20, 2005	Valles Caldera Preservation Act of 2005	An act to amend the Valles Caldera Preservation Act to improve the preservation of the Valles Caldera, and for other purposes	Pub. L. 109–132 (text) (PDF)
109-133	December 20, 2005	(No short title)	An act to amend the Act of June 7, 1924, to provide for the exercise of criminal jurisdiction	Pub. L. 109–133 (text) (PDF)
109-134	December 20, 2005	Naval Vessels Transfer Act of 2005	An act to authorize the transfer of naval vessels to certain foreign recipients	Pub. L. 109–134 (text) (PDF)
109-135	December 21, 2005	(No short title)	An act to amend the Internal Revenue Code of 1986 to provide tax benefits for the Gulf Opportunity Zone and certain areas affected by Hurricanes Rita and Wilma, and for other purposes	Pub. L. 109–135 (text) (PDF)
109-136	December 22, 2005	Native American Housing Enhancement Act of 2005	An act to amend the Native American Housing Assistance and Self-Determination Act of 1996 and other Acts to improve housing programs for Indians	Pub. L. 109–136 (text) (PDF)
109-137	December 22, 2005	(No short title)	An act to amend the Federal Water Pollution Control Act to extend the authorization of appropriations for Long Island Sound	Pub. L. 109–137 (text) (PDF)
109-138	December 22, 2005	Southern Oregon Bureau of Reclamation Repayment Act of 2005	An act to authorize early repayment of obligations to the Bureau of Reclamation within Rogue River Valley Irrigation District or within Medford Irrigation District	Pub. L. 109–138 (text) (PDF)
109-139	December 22, 2005	Predisaster Mitigation Program Reauthorization Act of 2005	An act to amend the Robert T. Stafford Disaster Relief and Emergency Assistance Act to reauthorize the predisaster mitigation program, and for other purposes	Pub. L. 109–139 (text) (PDF)
109-140	December 22, 2005	(No short title)	An act to provide certain authorities for the Department of State, and for other purposes	Pub. L. 109–140 (text) (PDF)
109-141	December 22, 2005	Coast Guard Hurricane Relief Act of 2005	An act to commend the outstanding efforts in response to Hurricane Katrina by members and employees of the Coast Guard, to provide temporary relief to certain persons affected by such hurricane with respect to certain laws administered by the Coast Guard, and for other purposes	Pub. L. 109–141 (text) (PDF)
109-142	December 22, 2005	(No short title)	Joint resolution recognizing Commodore John Barry as the first flag officer of the United States Navy	Pub. L. 109–142 (text) (PDF)
109-143	December 22, 2005	(No short title)	An act to reauthorize the Congressional Award Act	Pub. L. 109–143 (text) (PDF)
109-144	December 22, 2005	Terrorism Risk Insurance Extension Act of 2005	An act to extend the applicability of the Terrorism Risk Insurance Act of 2002	Pub. L. 109–144 (text) (PDF)
109-145	December 22, 2005	Presidential $1 Coin Act of 2005	An act to require the Secretary of the Treasury to mint coins in commemoration of each of the Nation's past Presidents and their spouses, respectively, to improve circulation of the $1 coin, to create a new bullion coin, and for other purposes	Pub. L. 109–145 (text) (PDF)
109-146	December 22, 2005	Little Rock Central High School Desegregation 50th Anniversary Commemorative Coin Act	An act to require the Secretary of the Treasury to mint coins in commemoration of the 50th anniversary of the desegregation of the Little Rock Central High School in Little Rock, Arkansas, and for other purposes	Pub. L. 109–146 (text) (PDF)
109-147	December 22, 2005	(No short title)	An act to allow binding arbitration clauses to be included in all contracts affecting land within the Gila River Indian Community Reservation	Pub. L. 109–147 (text) (PDF)
109-148	December 30, 2005	Department of Defense, Emergency Supplemental Appropriations to Address Hurricanes in the Gulf of Mexico, and Pandemic Influenza Act, 2006	An act making appropriations for the Department of Defense for the fiscal year ending September 30, 2006, and for other purposes	Pub. L. 109–148 (text) (PDF)
109-149	December 30, 2005	Departments of Labor, Health and Human Services, and Education, and Related Agencies Appropriations Act, 2006	An act making appropriations for the Departments of Labor, Health and Human Services, and Education, and Related Agencies for the fiscal year ending September 30, 2006, and for other purposes	Pub. L. 109–149 (text) (PDF)
109-150	December 30, 2005	Second Higher Education Extension Act of 2005	An act to temporarily extend the programs under the Higher Education Act of 1965, and for other purposes	Pub. L. 109–150 (text) (PDF)
109-151	December 30, 2005	(No short title)	An act to amend title I of the Employee Retirement Income Security Act of 1974, title XXVII of the Public Health Service Act, and the Internal Revenue Code of 1986 to extend by one year provisions requiring parity in the application of certain limits to mental health benefits	Pub. L. 109–151 (text) (PDF)
109-152	December 30, 2005	Buffalo Soldiers Commemoration Act of 2005	An act to authorize the American Battle Monuments Commission to establish in the State of Louisiana a memorial to honor the Buffalo Soldiers	Pub. L. 109–152 (text) (PDF)
109-153	December 30, 2005	Benjamin Franklin National Memorial Commemoration Act of 2005	An act to provide financial assistance for the rehabilitation of the Benjamin Franklin National Memorial in Philadelphia, Pennsylvania, and the development of an exhibit to commemorate the 300th anniversary of the birth of Benjamin Franklin	Pub. L. 109–153 (text) (PDF)
109-154	December 30, 2005	Public Lands Corps Healthy Forests Restoration Act of 2005	An act to amend the Public Lands Corps Act of 1993 to provide for the conduct of projects that protect forests, and for other purposes	Pub. L. 109–154 (text) (PDF)
109-155	December 30, 2005	National Aeronautics and Space Administration Authorization Act of 2005	An act to authorize the programs of the National Aeronautics and Space Administration	Pub. L. 109–155 (text) (PDF)
109-156	December 30, 2005	Delaware Water Gap National Recreation Area Improvement Act	An act to authorize the Secretary of the Interior to allow the Columbia Gas Transmission Corporation to increase the diameter of a natural gas pipeline located in the Delaware Water Gap National Recreation Area, to allow certain commercial vehicles to continue to use Route 209 within Delaware Water Gap National Recreation Area, and to extend the termination date of the National Park System Advisory Board to January 1, 2007	Pub. L. 109–156 (text) (PDF)
109-157	December 30, 2005	Indian Land Probate Reform Technical Corrections Act of 2005	An act to amend the Indian Land Consolidation Act to provide for probate reform	Pub. L. 109–157 (text) (PDF)
109-158	December 30, 2005	(No short title)	An act to amend Pub. L. 107–153 (text) (PDF) to modify a certain date	Pub. L. 109–158 (text) (PDF)
109-159	December 30, 2005	(No short title)	An act to authorize the transfer of items in the War Reserves Stockpile for Allies, Korea	Pub. L. 109–159 (text) (PDF)
109-160	December 30, 2005	(No short title)	An act to amend the USA PATRIOT ACT to extend the sunset of certain provisions of that Act and the lone wolf provision of the Intelligence Reform and Terrorism Prevention Act of 2004 to July 1, 2006	Pub. L. 109–160 (text) (PDF)
109-161	December 30, 2005	TANF and Child Care Continuation Act of 2005	An act to reauthorize the Temporary Assistance for Needy Families block grant program through March 31, 2006, and for other purposes	Pub. L. 109–161 (text) (PDF)
109-162	January 5, 2006	Violence Against Women and Department of Justice Reauthorization Act of 2005	An act to authorize appropriations for the Department of Justice for fiscal years 2006 through 2009, and for other purposes	Pub. L. 109–162 (text) (PDF)
109-163	January 6, 2006	National Defense Authorization Act for Fiscal Year 2006	An act to authorize appropriations for fiscal year 2006 for military activities of the Department of Defense, for military construction, and for defense activities of the Department of Energy, to prescribe military personnel strengths for such fiscal year, and for other purposes	Pub. L. 109–163 (text) (PDF)
109-164	January 10, 2006	Trafficking Victims Protection Reauthorization Act of 2005	An act to authorize appropriations for fiscal years 2006 and 2007 for the Trafficking Victims Protection Act of 2000, and for other purposes	Pub. L. 109–164 (text) (PDF)
109-165	January 10, 2006	Torture Victims Relief Reauthorization Act of 2005	An act to amend the Torture Victims Relief Act of 1998 to authorize appropriations to provide assistance for domestic and foreign programs and centers for the treatment of victims of torture, and for other purposes	Pub. L. 109–165 (text) (PDF)
109-166	January 10, 2006	Junior Duck Stamp Reauthorization Amendments Act of 2005	An act to reauthorize and amend the Junior Duck Stamp Conservation and Design Program Act of 1994	Pub. L. 109–166 (text) (PDF)
109-167	January 10, 2006	Passport Services Enhancement Act of 2005	An act to amend the Passport Act of June 4, 1920, to authorize the Secretary of State to establish and collect a surcharge to cover the costs of meeting the increased demand for passports as a result of actions taken to comply with section 7209(b) of the Intelligence Reform and Terrorism Prevention Act of 2004	Pub. L. 109–167 (text) (PDF)
109-168	January 10, 2006	(No short title)	An act to make certain technical corrections in amendments made by the Energy Policy Act of 2005	Pub. L. 109–168 (text) (PDF)
109-169	January 11, 2006	United States-Bahrain Free Trade Agreement Implementation Act	An act to implement the United States-Bahrain Free Trade Agreement	Pub. L. 109–169 (text) (PDF)
109-170	February 3, 2006	(No short title)	An act to amend the USA PATRIOT ACT to extend the sunset of certain provisions of such Act	Pub. L. 109–170 (text) (PDF)
109-171	February 8, 2006	Deficit Reduction Act of 2005	An act to provide for reconciliation pursuant to section 202(a) of the concurrent resolution on the budget for fiscal year 2006 (H. Con. Res. 95)	Pub. L. 109–171 (text) (PDF)
109-172	February 10, 2006	State High Risk Pool Funding Extension Act of 2006	An act to amend the Public Health Service Act to extend funding for the operation of State high risk health insurance pools	Pub. L. 109–172 (text) (PDF)
109-173	February 15, 2006	Federal Deposit Insurance Reform Conforming Amendments Act of 2005	An act to enact the technical and conforming amendments necessary to implement the Federal Deposit Insurance Reform Act of 2005, and for other purposes	Pub. L. 109–173 (text) (PDF)
109-174	February 18, 2006	(No short title)	An act making supplemental appropriations for fiscal year 2006 for the Small Business Administration's disaster loans program, and for other purposes	Pub. L. 109–174 (text) (PDF)
109-175	February 27, 2006	(No short title)	An act to designate the facility of the United States Postal Service located at 57 Rolfe Square in Cranston, Rhode Island, shall be known and designated as the "Holly A. Charette Post Office"	Pub. L. 109–175 (text) (PDF)
109-176	March 6, 2006	Katrina Emergency Assistance Act of 2006	An act to provide relief for the victims of Hurricane Katrina	Pub. L. 109–176 (text) (PDF)
109-177	March 9, 2006	USA PATRIOT Improvement and Reauthorization Act of 2005	An act to extend and modify authorities needed to combat terrorism, and for other purposes	Pub. L. 109–177 (text) (PDF)
109-178	March 9, 2006	USA PATRIOT Act Additional Reauthorizing Amendments Act of 2006	An act to clarify that individuals who receive FISA orders can challenge nondisclosure requirements, that individuals who receive national security letters are not required to disclose the name of their attorney, that libraries are not wire or electronic communication service providers unless they provide specific services, and for other purposes	Pub. L. 109–178 (text) (PDF)
109-179	March 13, 2006	(No short title)	An act to facilitate shareholder consideration of proposals to make Settlement Common Stock under the Alaska Native Claims Settlement Act available to missed enrollees, eligible elders, and eligible persons born after December 18, 1971, and for other purposes	Pub. L. 109–179 (text) (PDF)
109-180	March 14, 2006	(No short title)	An act to designate the facility of the United States Postal Service located at 4422 West Sciota Street in Scio, New York, as the "Corporal Jason L. Dunham Post Office"	Pub. L. 109–180 (text) (PDF)
109-181	March 16, 2006	(No short title)	An act to amend title 18, United States Code, to provide criminal penalties for trafficking in counterfeit marks	Pub. L. 109–181 (text) (PDF)
109-182	March 20, 2006	(No short title)	Joint resolution increasing the statutory limit on the public debt	Pub. L. 109–182 (text) (PDF)
109-183	March 20, 2006	Upper Colorado and San Juan River Basin Endangered Fish Recovery Programs Reauthorization Act of 2005	An act to reauthorize the Upper Colorado and San Juan River Basin endangered fish recovery implementation programs	Pub. L. 109–183 (text) (PDF)
109-184	March 20, 2006	(No short title)	An act to designate the facility of the United States Postal Service located at 312 East North Avenue in Flora, Illinois, as the "Robert T. Ferguson Post Office Building"	Pub. L. 109–184 (text) (PDF)
109-185	March 20, 2006	(No short title)	An act to designate the facility of the United States Postal Service located at 2000 McDonough Street in Joliet, Illinois, as the "John F. Whiteside Joliet Post Office Building"	Pub. L. 109–185 (text) (PDF)
109-186	March 20, 2006	(No short title)	An act to designate the facility of the United States Postal Service located at 105 NW Railroad Avenue in Hammond, Louisiana, as the "John J. Hainkel, Jr. Post Office Building"	Pub. L. 109–186 (text) (PDF)
109-187	March 20, 2006	(No short title)	An act to designate the facility of the United States Postal Service located at 1202 1st Street in Humble, Texas, as the "Lillian McKay Post Office Building"	Pub. L. 109–187 (text) (PDF)
109-188	March 20, 2006	(No short title)	An act to redesignate the facility of the United States Postal Service located at 1927 Sangamon Avenue in Springfield, Illinois, as the "J.M. Dietrich Northeast Annex"	Pub. L. 109–188 (text) (PDF)
109-189	March 20, 2006	(No short title)	An act to designate the facility of the United States Postal Service located at 102 South Walters Avenue in Hodgenville, Kentucky, as the "Abraham Lincoln Birthplace Post Office Building"	Pub. L. 109–189 (text) (PDF)
109-190	March 20, 2006	(No short title)	An act to designate the facility of the United States Postal Service located at 3038 West Liberty Avenue in Pittsburgh, Pennsylvania, as the "Congressman James Grove Fulton Memorial Post Office Building"	Pub. L. 109–190 (text) (PDF)
109-191	March 20, 2006	(No short title)	An act to designate the facility of the United States Postal Service located at 6483 Lincoln Street in Gagetown, Michigan, as the "Gagetown Veterans Memorial Post Office"	Pub. L. 109–191 (text) (PDF)
109-192	March 20, 2006	(No short title)	An act to designate the facility of the United States Postal Service located at 201 North 3rd Street in Smithfield, North Carolina, as the "Ava Gardner Post Office"	Pub. L. 109–192 (text) (PDF)
109-193	March 20, 2006	(No short title)	An act to designate the facility of the United States Postal Service located on Franklin Avenue in Pearl River, New York, as the "Heinz Ahlmeyer, Jr. Post Office Building"	Pub. L. 109–193 (text) (PDF)
109-194	March 20, 2006	(No short title)	An act to designate the facility of the United States Postal Service located at 8501 Philatelic Drive in Spring Hill, Florida, as the "Staff Sergeant Michael Schafer Post Office Building"	Pub. L. 109–194 (text) (PDF)
109-195	March 20, 2006	(No short title)	An act to designate the facility of the United States Postal Service located at 205 West Washington Street in Knox, Indiana, as the "Grant W. Green Post Office Building"	Pub. L. 109–195 (text) (PDF)
109-196	March 20, 2006	(No short title)	An act to designate the facility of the United States Postal Service located at 770 Trumbull Drive in Pittsburgh, Pennsylvania, as the "Clayton J. Smith Memorial Post Office Building"	Pub. L. 109–196 (text) (PDF)
109-197	March 20, 2006	(No short title)	An act to designate the facility of the United States Postal Service located at 130 East Marion Avenue in Punta Gorda, Florida, as the "U.S. Cleveland Post Office Building"	Pub. L. 109–197 (text) (PDF)
109-198	March 20, 2006	(No short title)	An act to designate the facility of the United States Postal Service located at 37598 Goodhue Avenue in Dennison, Minnesota, as the "Albert H. Quie Post Office"	Pub. L. 109–198 (text) (PDF)
109-199	March 20, 2006	(No short title)	An act to designate the facility of the United States Postal Service located at 545 North Rimsdale Avenue in Covina, California, as the "Lillian Kinkella Keil Post Office"	Pub. L. 109–199 (text) (PDF)
109-200	March 20, 2006	(No short title)	An act to designate the facility of the United States Postal Service located at 1826 Pennsylvania Avenue in Baltimore, Maryland, as the "Maryland State Delegate Lena K. Lee Post Office Building"	Pub. L. 109–200 (text) (PDF)
109-201	March 20, 2006	(No short title)	An act to designate the facility of the United States Postal Service located at 320 High Street in Clinton, Massachusetts, as the "Raymond J. Salmon Post Office"	Pub. L. 109–201 (text) (PDF)
109-202	March 20, 2006	(No short title)	An act to designate the facility of the United States Postal Service located at 12760 South Park Avenue in Riverton, Utah, as the "Mont and Mark Stephensen Veterans Memorial Post Office Building"	Pub. L. 109–202 (text) (PDF)
109-203	March 20, 2006	(No short title)	An act to designate the facility of the United States Postal Service located at 1271 North King Street in Honolulu, Oahu, Hawaii, as the "Hiram L. Fong Post Office Building"	Pub. L. 109–203 (text) (PDF)
109-204	March 20, 2006	(No short title)	An act to make available funds included in the Deficit Reduction Act of 2005 for the Low-Income Home Energy Assistance Program for fiscal year 2006, and for other purposes	Pub. L. 109–204 (text) (PDF)
109-205	March 23, 2006	(No short title)	An act to authorize the extension of nondiscriminatory treatment (normal trade relations treatment) to the products of Ukraine	Pub. L. 109–205 (text) (PDF)
109-206	March 23, 2006	(No short title)	An act to designate the Department of Veterans Affairs outpatient clinic in Appleton, Wisconsin, as the "John H. Bradley Department of Veterans Affairs Outpatient Clinic"	Pub. L. 109–206 (text) (PDF)
109-207	March 23, 2006	(No short title)	An act to designate the facility of the United States Postal Service located at 122 South Bill Street in Francesville, Indiana, as the Malcolm Melville "Mac" Lawrence Post Office	Pub. L. 109–207 (text) (PDF)
109-208	March 23, 2006	National Flood Insurance Program Enhanced Borrowing Authority Act of 2006	An act an Act to temporarily increase the borrowing authority of the Federal Emergency Management Agency for carrying out the national flood insurance program	Pub. L. 109–208 (text) (PDF)
109-209	March 24, 2006	(No short title)	An act to extend through December 31, 2006, the authority of the Secretary of the Army to accept and expend funds contributed by non-Federal public entities to expedite the processing of permits	Pub. L. 109–209 (text) (PDF)
109-210	March 24, 2006	(No short title)	An act to waive the passport fees for a relative of a deceased member of the Armed Forces proceeding abroad to visit the grave of such member or to attend a funeral or memorial service for such member	Pub. L. 109–210 (text) (PDF)
109-211	March 24, 2006	(No short title)	An act to extend the educational flexibility program under section 4 of the Education Flexibility Partnership Act of 1999	Pub. L. 109–211 (text) (PDF)
109-212	April 1, 2006	Higher Education Extension Act of 2006	An act to temporarily extend the programs under the Higher Education Act of 1965, and for other purposes	Pub. L. 109–212 (text) (PDF)
109-213	April 11, 2006	(No short title)	An act to award a congressional gold medal on behalf of the Tuskegee Airmen, collectively, in recognition of their unique military record, which inspired revolutionary reform in the Armed Forces	Pub. L. 109–213 (text) (PDF)
109-214	April 11, 2006	(No short title)	An act to transfer jurisdiction of certain real property to the Supreme Court	Pub. L. 109–214 (text) (PDF)
109-215	April 11, 2006	Milk Regulatory Equity Act of 2005	An act to ensure regulatory equity between and among all dairy farmers and handlers for sales of packaged fluid milk in federally regulated milk marketing areas and into certain non-federally regulated milk marketing areas from federally regulated areas, and for other purposes	Pub. L. 109–215 (text) (PDF)
109-216	April 13, 2006	(No short title)	Joint resolution providing for the appointment of Phillip Frost as a citizen regent of the Board of Regents of the Smithsonian Institution	Pub. L. 109–216 (text) (PDF)
109-217	April 13, 2006	(No short title)	Joint resolution providing for the reappointment of Alan G. Spoon as a citizen regent of the Board of Regents of the Smithsonian Institution	Pub. L. 109–217 (text) (PDF)
109-218	April 20, 2006	Local Community Recovery Act of 2006	An act to amend the Robert T. Stafford Disaster Relief and Emergency Assistance Act to clarify the preference for local firms in the award of certain contracts for disaster relief activities	Pub. L. 109–218 (text) (PDF)
109-219	May 5, 2006	Glendo Unit of the Missouri River Basin Project Contract Extension Act of 2005	An act to amend the Irrigation Project Contract Extension Act of 1998 to extend certain contracts between the Bureau of Reclamation and certain irrigation water contractors in the States of Wyoming and Nebraska	Pub. L. 109–219 (text) (PDF)
109-220	May 5, 2006	(No short title)	Joint resolution approving the location of the commemorative work in the District of Columbia honoring former President Dwight D. Eisenhower	Pub. L. 109–220 (text) (PDF)
109-221	May 12, 2006	Native American Technical Corrections Act of 2006	An act to make technical corrections to laws relating to Native Americans, and for other purposes	Pub. L. 109–221 (text) (PDF)
109-222	May 17, 2006	Tax Increase Prevention and Reconciliation Act of 2005	An act to provide for reconciliation pursuant to section 201(b) of the concurrent resolution on the budget for fiscal year 2006	Pub. L. 109–222 (text) (PDF)
109-223	May 18, 2006	(No short title)	Joint resolution to memorialize and honor the contribution of Chief Justice William H. Rehnquist	Pub. L. 109–223 (text) (PDF)
109-224	May 18, 2006	(No short title)	An act to require the Secretary of the Interior to accept the conveyance of certain land, to be held in trust for the benefit of the Puyallup Indian tribe	Pub. L. 109–224 (text) (PDF)
109-225	May 25, 2006	James Campbell National Wildlife Refuge Expansion Act of 2005	An act to provide for the expansion of the James Campbell National Wildlife Refuge, Honolulu County, Hawaii	Pub. L. 109–225 (text) (PDF)
109-226	May 25, 2006	Coastal Barrier Resources Reauthorization Act of 2005	An act to reauthorize the Coastal Barrier Resources Act, and for other purposes	Pub. L. 109–226 (text) (PDF)
109-227	May 29, 2006	Heroes Earned Retirement Opportunities Act	An act to amend the Internal Revenue Code of 1986 to allow members of the Armed Forces serving in a combat zone to make contributions to their individual retirement plans even if the compensation on which such contribution is based is excluded from gross income, and for other purposes	Pub. L. 109–227 (text) (PDF)
109-228	May 29, 2006	Respect for America's Fallen Heroes Act	An act to amend titles 38 and 18, United States Code, to prohibit certain demonstrations at cemeteries under the control of the National Cemetery Administration and at Arlington National Cemetery, and for other purposes	Pub. L. 109–228 (text) (PDF)
109-229	May 31, 2006	(No short title)	An act to provide for the participation of employees in the judicial branch in the Federal leave transfer program for disasters and emergencies	Pub. L. 109–229 (text) (PDF)
109-230	June 15, 2006	San Francisco Old Mint Commemorative Coin Act	An act to require the Secretary of the Treasury to mint coins in commemoration of the Old Mint at San Francisco, otherwise known as the "Granite Lady", and for other purposes	Pub. L. 109–230 (text) (PDF)
109-231	June 15, 2006	(No short title)	An act to designate the Department of Veterans Affairs Medical Center in Muskogee, Oklahoma, as the Jack C. Montgomery Department of Veterans Affairs Medical Center	Pub. L. 109–231 (text) (PDF)
109-232	June 15, 2006	Lewis and Clark Commemorative Coin Correction Act	An act to amend section 308 of the Lewis and Clark Expedition Bicentennial Commemorative Coin Act to make certain clarifying and technical amendments	Pub. L. 109–232 (text) (PDF)
109-233	June 15, 2006	Veterans' Housing Opportunity and Benefits Improvement Act of 2006	An act to amend title 38, United States Code, to improve and extend housing, insurance, outreach, and benefits programs provided under the laws administered by the Secretary of Veterans Affairs, to improve and extend employment programs for veterans under laws administered by the Secretary of Labor, and for other purposes	Pub. L. 109–233 (text) (PDF)
109-234	June 15, 2006	Emergency Supplemental Appropriations Act for Defense, the Global War on Terror, and Hurricane Recovery, 2006	An act making emergency supplemental appropriations for the fiscal year ending September 30, 2006, and for other purposes	Pub. L. 109–234 (text) (PDF)
109-235	June 15, 2006	Broadcast Decency Enforcement Act of 2005	An act to increase the penalties for violations by television and radio broadcasters of the prohibitions against transmission of obscene, indecent, and profane language	Pub. L. 109–235 (text) (PDF)
109-236	June 15, 2006	Mine Improvement and New Emergency Response Act of 2006	An act to amend the Federal Mine Safety and Health Act of 1977 to improve the safety of mines and mining	Pub. L. 109–236 (text) (PDF)
109-237	June 23, 2006	(No short title)	An act to designate the facility of the United States Postal Service located at 520 Colorado Avenue in Arriba, Colorado, as the "William H. Emery Post Office"	Pub. L. 109–237 (text) (PDF)
109-238	June 30, 2006	Second Higher Education Extension Act of 2006	An act to temporarily extend the programs under the Higher Education Act of 1965, and for other purposes	Pub. L. 109–238 (text) (PDF)
109-239	July 3, 2006	Safe and Timely Interstate Placement of Foster Children Act of 2006	An act to improve protections for children and to hold States accountable for the safe and timely placement of children across State lines, and for other purposes	Pub. L. 109–239 (text) (PDF)
109-240	July 10, 2006	Rural Health Care Capital Access Act of 2006	An act to amend section 242 of the National Housing Act to extend the exemption for critical access hospitals under the FHA program for mortgage insurance for hospitals	Pub. L. 109–240 (text) (PDF)
109-241	July 11, 2006	Coast Guard and Maritime Transportation Act of 2006	An act to authorize appropriations for the Coast Guard for fiscal year 2006, to make technical corrections to various laws administered by the Coast Guard, and for other purposes	Pub. L. 109–241 (text) (PDF)
109-242	July 19, 2006	Fetus Farming Prohibition Act of 2006	An act to amend the Public Health Service Act to prohibit the solicitation or acceptance of tissue from fetuses gestated for research purposes, and for other purposes	Pub. L. 109–242 (text) (PDF)
109-243	July 24, 2006	Freedom to Display the American Flag Act of 2005	An act to ensure that the right of an individual to display the flag of the United States on residential property not be abridged	Pub. L. 109–243 (text) (PDF)
109-244	July 25, 2006	(No short title)	Joint resolution authorizing the printing and binding of a supplement to, and revised edition of, Senate Procedure	Pub. L. 109–244 (text) (PDF)
109-245	July 26, 2006	(No short title)	An act to amend the Public Health Service Act with respect to the National Foundation for the Centers for Disease Control and Prevention	Pub. L. 109–245 (text) (PDF)
109-246	July 27, 2006	Fannie Lou Hamer, Rosa Parks, and Coretta Scott King Voting Rights Act Reauthorization and Amendments Act of 2006	An act to amend the Voting Rights Act of 1965	Pub. L. 109–246 (text) (PDF)
109-247	July 27, 2006	Louis Braille Bicentennial--Braille Literacy Commemorative Coin Act	An act to require the Secretary of the Treasury to mint coins in commemoration of Louis Braille	Pub. L. 109–247 (text) (PDF)
109-248	July 27, 2006	Adam Walsh Child Protection and Safety Act of 2006	An act to protect children from sexual exploitation and violent crime, to prevent child abuse and child pornography, to promote Internet safety, and to honor the memory of Adam Walsh and other child crime victims	Pub. L. 109–248 (text) (PDF)
109-249	July 27, 2006	(No short title)	An act to exempt persons with disabilities from the prohibition against providing section 8 rental assistance to college students	Pub. L. 109–249 (text) (PDF)
109-250	July 27, 2006	(No short title)	An act to amend section 1113 of the Social Security Act to temporarily increase funding for the program of temporary assistance for United States citizens returned from foreign countries, and for other purposes	Pub. L. 109–250 (text) (PDF)
109-251	August 1, 2006	(No short title)	Joint resolution approving the renewal of import restrictions contained in the Burmese Freedom and Democracy Act of 2003, and for other purposes	Pub. L. 109–251 (text) (PDF)
109-252	August 1, 2006	(No short title)	An act to designate the facility of the United States Postal Service located at 306 2nd Avenue in Brockway, Montana, as the "Paul Kasten Post Office Building"	Pub. L. 109–252 (text) (PDF)
109-253	August 1, 2006	(No short title)	An act to designate the facility of the United States Postal Service located at 100 Avenida RL Rodriguez in Bayamon, Puerto Rico, as the "Dr. Jose Celso Barbosa Post Office Building"	Pub. L. 109–253 (text) (PDF)
109-254	August 1, 2006	(No short title)	An act to designate the facility of the United States Postal Service located at 210 West 3rd Avenue in Warren, Pennsylvania, as the "William F. Clinger, Jr. Post Office Building"	Pub. L. 109–254 (text) (PDF)
109-255	August 1, 2006	(No short title)	An act to designate the facility of the United States Postal Service located at 80 Killian Road in Massapequa, New York, as the "Gerard A. Fiorenza Post Office Building"	Pub. L. 109–255 (text) (PDF)
109-256	August 1, 2006	(No short title)	An act to designate the facility of the United States Postal Service located at 170 East Main Street in Patchogue, New York, as the "Lieutenant Michael P. Murphy Post Office Building"	Pub. L. 109–256 (text) (PDF)
109-257	August 1, 2006	(No short title)	An act to designate the facility of the United States Postal Service located at 3000 Homewood Avenue in Baltimore, Maryland, as the "State Senator Verda Welcome and Dr. Henry Welcome Post Office Building"	Pub. L. 109–257 (text) (PDF)
109-258	August 2, 2006	(No short title)	An act to designate the facility of the United States Postal Service located at 2404 Race Street in Jonesboro, Arkansas, as the "Hattie W. Caraway Station"	Pub. L. 109–258 (text) (PDF)
109-259	August 2, 2006	(No short title)	An act to designate the facility of the United States Postal Service located at 8624 Ferguson Road in Dallas, Texas, as the "Francisco 'Pancho' Medrano Post Office Building"	Pub. L. 109–259 (text) (PDF)
109-260	August 2, 2006	(No short title)	An act to designate the facility of the United States Postal Service located at 1 Boyden Street in Badin, North Carolina, as the "Mayor John Thompson 'Tom' Garrison Memorial Post Office"	Pub. L. 109–260 (text) (PDF)
109-261	August 2, 2006	(No short title)	An act to designate the facility of the United States Postal Service located at 535 Wood Street in Bethlehem, Pennsylvania, as the "H. Gordon Payrow Post Office Building"	Pub. L. 109–261 (text) (PDF)
109-262	August 2, 2006	(No short title)	An act to designate the facility of the United States Postal Service located at 7 Columbus Avenue in Tuckahoe, New York, as the "Ronald Bucca Post Office	Pub. L. 109–262 (text) (PDF)
109-263	August 2, 2006	(No short title)	An act to designate the facility of the United States Postal Service located at 1 Marble Street in Fair Haven, Vermont, as the "Matthew Lyon Post Office Building"	Pub. L. 109–263 (text) (PDF)
109-264	August 3, 2006	(No short title)	An act to amend title 4 of the United States Code to clarify the treatment of self-employment for purposes of the limitation on State taxation of retirement income	Pub. L. 109–264 (text) (PDF)
109-265	August 3, 2006	Newlands Project Headquarters and Maintenance Yard Facility Transfer Act	An act to direct the Secretary of the Interior to convey the Newlands Project Headquarters and Maintenance Yard Facility to the Truckee-Carson Irrigation District in the State of Nevada	Pub. L. 109–265 (text) (PDF)
109-266	August 3, 2006	Migratory Bird Hunting and Conservation Stamp Act	An act to direct the Secretary of the Interior to conduct a pilot program under which up to 15 States may issue electronic Federal migratory bird hunting stamps	Pub. L. 109–266 (text) (PDF)
109-267	August 4, 2006	(No short title)	An act to amend the Iran and Libya Sanctions Act of 1996 to extend the authorities provided in such Act until September 29, 2006	Pub. L. 109–267 (text) (PDF)
109-268	August 4, 2006	(No short title)	An act to provide funding authority to facilitate the evacuation of persons from Lebanon, and for other purposes	Pub. L. 109–268 (text) (PDF)
109-269	August 12, 2006	(No short title)	An act to redesignate the Mason Neck National Wildlife Refuge in Virginia as the Elizabeth Hartwell Mason Neck National Wildlife Refuge	Pub. L. 109–269 (text) (PDF)
109-270	August 12, 2006	Carl D. Perkins Career and Technical Education Act of 2006	An act to amend the Carl D. Perkins Vocational and Technical Education Act of 1998 to improve the Act	Pub. L. 109–270 (text) (PDF)
109-271	August 12, 2006	Department of Justice Appropriations Authorization Act of 2005	An act to make technical corrections to the Violence Against Women and Department of Justice Reauthorization Act of 2005	Pub. L. 109–271 (text) (PDF)
109-272	August 14, 2006	(No short title)	An act to preserve the Mt. Soledad Veterans Memorial in San Diego, California, by providing for the immediate acquisition of the memorial by the United States	Pub. L. 109–272 (text) (PDF)
109-273	August 17, 2006	(No short title)	An act to designate the facility of the United States Postal Service located at 7320 Reseda Boulevard in Reseda, California, as the "Coach John Wooden Post Office Building"	Pub. L. 109–273 (text) (PDF)
109-274	August 17, 2006	(No short title)	An act to designate the facility of the United States Postal Service located at 215 West Industrial Park Road in Harrison, Arkansas, as the "John Paul Hammerschmidt Post Office Building"	Pub. L. 109–274 (text) (PDF)
109-275	August 17, 2006	(No short title)	An act to designate the facility of the United States Postal Service located at 100 Pitcher Street in Utica, New York, as the "Captain George A. Wood Post Office Building"	Pub. L. 109–275 (text) (PDF)
109-276	August 17, 2006	(No short title)	An act to designate the facility of the United States Postal Service located at 1750 16th Street South in St. Petersburg, Florida, as the "Morris W. Milton Post Office"	Pub. L. 109–276 (text) (PDF)
109-277	August 17, 2006	(No short title)	An act to designate the facility of the United States Postal Service located at 1400 West Jordan Street in Pensacola, Florida, as the "Earl D. Hutto Post Office Building"	Pub. L. 109–277 (text) (PDF)
109-278	August 17, 2006	(No short title)	An act to designate the facility of the United States Postal Service located at 1310 Highway 64 NW. in Ramsey, Indiana, as the "Wilfred Edward 'Cousin Willie' Sieg, Sr. Post Office"	Pub. L. 109–278 (text) (PDF)
109-279	August 17, 2006	(No short title)	An act to designate the facility of the United States Postal Service located at 217 Southeast 2nd Street in Dimmitt, Texas, as the "Sergeant Jacob Dan Dones Post Office"	Pub. L. 109–279 (text) (PDF)
109-280	August 17, 2006	Pension Protection Act of 2006	An act to provide economic security for all Americans, and for other purposes	Pub. L. 109–280 (text) (PDF)
109-281	September 22, 2006	YouthBuild Transfer Act	An act to amend the Workforce Investment Act of 1998 to provide for a YouthBuild program	Pub. L. 109–281 (text) (PDF)
109-282	September 26, 2006	Federal Funding Accountability and Transparency Act of 2006	An act to require full disclosure of all entities and organizations receiving Federal funds	Pub. L. 109–282 (text) (PDF)
109-283	September 26, 2006	United States-Oman Free Trade Agreement Implementation Act	An act to implement the United States-Oman Free Trade Agreement	Pub. L. 109–283 (text) (PDF)
109-284	September 27, 2006	(No short title)	An act to make technical corrections to the United States Code	Pub. L. 109–284 (text) (PDF)
109-285	September 27, 2006	Abraham Lincoln Commemorative Coin Act	An act to require the Secretary of the Treasury to mint coins in commemoration of the bicentennial of the birth of Abraham Lincoln	Pub. L. 109–285 (text) (PDF)
109-286	September 27, 2006	Pueblo de San Ildefonso Claims Settlement Act of 2005	An act to resolve certain Native American claims in New Mexico, and for other purposes	Pub. L. 109–286 (text) (PDF)
109-287	September 27, 2006	(No short title)	An act to award a congressional gold medal to Tenzin Gyatso, the Fourteenth Dalai Lama, in recognition of his many enduring and outstanding contributions to peace, non-violence, human rights, and religious understanding	Pub. L. 109–287 (text) (PDF)
109-288	September 28, 2006	Child and Family Services Improvement Act of 2006	An act to amend part B of title IV of the Social Security Act to reauthorize the promoting safe and stable families program, and for other purposes	Pub. L. 109–288 (text) (PDF)
109-289	September 29, 2006	Department of Defense Appropriations Act, 2007	An act making appropriations for the Department of Defense for the fiscal year ending September 30, 2007, and for other purposes	Pub. L. 109–289 (text) (PDF)
109-290	September 29, 2006	Military Personnel Financial Services Protection Act	An act to protect members of the Armed Forces from unscrupulous practices regarding sales of insurance, financial, and investment products	Pub. L. 109–290 (text) (PDF)
109-291	September 29, 2006	Credit Rating Agency Reform Act of 2006	An act to improve ratings quality for the protection of investors and in the public interest by fostering accountability, transparency, and competition in the credit rating agency industry	Pub. L. 109–291 (text) (PDF)
109-292	September 30, 2006	Third Higher Education Extension Act of 2006	An act to temporarily extend the programs under the Higher Education Act of 1965, and for other purposes	Pub. L. 109–292 (text) (PDF)
109-293	September 30, 2006	Iran Freedom Support Act	An act to hold the current regime in Iran accountable for its threatening behavior and to support a transition to democracy in Iran	Pub. L. 109–293 (text) (PDF)
109-294	October 3, 2006	Partners for Fish and Wildlife Act	An act to authorize the Secretary of the Interior to provide technical and financial assistance to private landowners to restore, enhance, and manage private land to improve fish and wildlife habitats through the Partners for Fish and Wildlife Program	Pub. L. 109–294 (text) (PDF)
109-295	October 4, 2006	Department of Homeland Security Appropriations Act, 2007	An act making appropriations for the Department of Homeland Security for the fiscal year ending September 30, 2007, and for other purposes	Pub. L. 109–295 (text) (PDF)
109-296	October 5, 2006	(No short title)	An act to reauthorize the Livestock Mandatory Reporting Act of 1999 and to amend the swine reporting provisions of that Act	Pub. L. 109–296 (text) (PDF)
109-297	October 5, 2006	(No short title)	An act to extend the deadline for commencement of construction of a hydroelectric project in the State of Alaska	Pub. L. 109–297 (text) (PDF)
109-298	October 5, 2006	(No short title)	An act to extend the deadline for commencement of construction of a hydroelectric project in the State of Wyoming	Pub. L. 109–298 (text) (PDF)
109-299	October 5, 2006	Wichita Project Equus Beds Division Authorization Act of 2005	An act to amend the Act entitled "An Act to provide for the construction of the Cheney division, Wichita Federal reclamation project, Kansas, and for other purposes" to authorize the Equus Beds Division of the Wichita Project	Pub. L. 109–299 (text) (PDF)
109-300	October 5, 2006	(No short title)	An act to designate the facility of the United States Postal Service located at 7172 North Tongass Highway, Ward Cove, Alaska, as the "Alice R. Brusich Post Office Building"	Pub. L. 109–300 (text) (PDF)
109-301	October 5, 2006	(No short title)	An act to designate the facility of the United States Postal Service located on Lindbald Avenue, Girdwood, Alaska, as the "Dorothy and Connie Hibbs Post Office Building"	Pub. L. 109–301 (text) (PDF)
109-302	October 5, 2006	(No short title)	An act to designate the facility of the United States Postal Service located at 8801 Sudley Road in Manassas, Virginia, as the "Harry J. Parrish Post Office"	Pub. L. 109–302 (text) (PDF)
109-303	October 6, 2006	Copyright Royalty Judges Program Technical Corrections Act	An act to amend title 17, United States Code, to make technical corrections relating to Copyright Royalty Judges, and for other purposes	Pub. L. 109–303 (text) (PDF)
109-304	October 6, 2006	(No short title)	An act to complete the codification of title 46, United States Code, "Shipping", as positive law	Pub. L. 109–304 (text) (PDF)
109-305	October 6, 2006	Railroad Retirement Technical Improvement Act of 2006	An act to amend the Railroad Retirement Act of 1974 to provide for continued payment of railroad retirement annuities by the Department of the Treasury, and for other purposes	Pub. L. 109–305 (text) (PDF)
109-306	October 6, 2006	(No short title)	An act to amend the John F. Kennedy Center Act to authorize additional appropriations for the John F. Kennedy Center for the Performing Arts for fiscal year 2007	Pub. L. 109–306 (text) (PDF)
109-307	October 6, 2006	Children's Hospital GME Support Reauthorization Act of 2006	An act to amend the Public Health Service Act to reauthorize support for graduate medical education programs in children's hospitals	Pub. L. 109–307 (text) (PDF)
109-308	October 6, 2006	Pets Evacuation and Transportation Standards Act of 2006	An act to amend the Robert T. Stafford Disaster Relief and Emergency Assistance Act to ensure that State and local emergency preparedness operational plans address the needs of individuals with household pets and service animals following a major disaster or emergency	Pub. L. 109–308 (text) (PDF)
109-309	October 6, 2006	(No short title)	An act to amend the Ojito Wilderness Act to make a technical correction	Pub. L. 109–309 (text) (PDF)
109-310	October 6, 2006	(No short title)	An act to designate the Post Office located at 5755 Post Road, East Greenwich, Rhode Island, as the "Richard L. Cevoli Post Office"	Pub. L. 109–310 (text) (PDF)
109-311	October 6, 2006	(No short title)	An act to designate the facility of the United States Postal Service located at 2951 New York Highway 43 in Averill Park, New York, as the "Major George Quamo Post Office Building"	Pub. L. 109–311 (text) (PDF)
109-312	October 6, 2006	Trademark Dilution Revision Act of 2006	An act to amend the Trademark Act of 1946 with respect to dilution by blurring or tarnishment	Pub. L. 109–312 (text) (PDF)
109-313	October 6, 2006	General Services Administration Modernization Act	An act to amend title 40, United States Code, to establish a Federal Acquisition Service, to replace the General Supply Fund and the Information Technology Fund with an Acquisition Services Fund, and for other purposes	Pub. L. 109–313 (text) (PDF)
109-314	October 6, 2006	National Law Enforcement Officers Memorial Maintenance Fund Act of 2005	An act to amend Public Law 104-329 to modify authorities for the use of the National Law Enforcement Officers Memorial Maintenance Fund, and for other purposes	Pub. L. 109–314 (text) (PDF)
109-315	October 10, 2006	(No short title)	An act to designate the facility of the United States Postal Service located at 110 Cooper Street in Babylon, New York, as the "Jacob Samuel Fletcher Post Office Building"	Pub. L. 109–315 (text) (PDF)
109-316	October 10, 2006	(No short title)	An act to extend temporarily certain authorities of the Small Business Administration	Pub. L. 109–316 (text) (PDF)
109-317	October 11, 2006	(No short title)	An act to authorize the Secretary of the Interior to study the suitability and feasibility of designating Castle Nugent Farms located on St. Croix, Virgin Islands, as a unit of the National Park System, and for other purposes	Pub. L. 109–317 (text) (PDF)
109-318	October 11, 2006	(No short title)	An act to amend the Yuma Crossing National Heritage Area Act of 2000 to adjust the boundary of the Yuma Crossing National Heritage Area, and for other purposes	Pub. L. 109–318 (text) (PDF)
109-319	October 11, 2006	Ste. Genevieve County National Historic Site Study Act of 2005	An act to authorize the Secretary of the Interior to study the suitability and feasibility of designating portions of Ste. Genevieve County in the State of Missouri as a unit of the National Park System, and for other purposes	Pub. L. 109–319 (text) (PDF)
109-320	October 11, 2006	Salt Cedar and Russian Olive Control Demonstration Act	An act to further the purposes of the Reclamation Projects Authorization and Adjustment Act of 1992 by directing the Secretary of the Interior, acting through the Commissioner of Reclamation, to carry out an assessment and demonstration program to control salt cedar and Russian olive, and for other purposes	Pub. L. 109–320 (text) (PDF)
109-321	October 11, 2006	(No short title)	An act to direct the Secretary of the Interior to convey certain water distribution facilities to the Northern Colorado Water Conservancy District	Pub. L. 109–321 (text) (PDF)
109-322	October 11, 2006	North American Wetlands Conservation Reauthorization Act of 2006	An act to reauthorize the North American Wetlands Conservation Act	Pub. L. 109–322 (text) (PDF)
109-323	October 11, 2006	(No short title)	An act to extend the waiver authority for the Secretary of Education under title IV, section 105, of Public Law 109-148	Pub. L. 109–323 (text) (PDF)
109-324	October 11, 2006	Rio Arriba County Land Conveyance Act	An act to direct the Secretary of the Interior to convey certain Federal land to Rio Arriba County, New Mexico	Pub. L. 109–324 (text) (PDF)
109-325	October 11, 2006	(No short title)	An act to extend relocation expenses test programs for Federal employees	Pub. L. 109–325 (text) (PDF)
109-326	October 11, 2006	Great Lakes Fish and Wildlife Restoration Act of 2006	An act to amend the Great Lakes Fish and Wildlife Restoration Act of 1990 to provide for implementation of recommendations of the United States Fish and Wildlife Service contained in the Great Lakes Fishery Resources Restoration Study	Pub. L. 109–326 (text) (PDF)
109-327	October 12, 2006	(No short title)	An act to designate the facility of the United States Postal Service located at 6101 Liberty Road in Baltimore, Maryland, as the "United States Representative Parren J. Mitchell Post Office"	Pub. L. 109–327 (text) (PDF)
109-328	October 12, 2006	(No short title)	An act to designate the facility of the United States Postal Service located at 110 North Chestnut Street in Olathe, Kansas, as the "Governor John Anderson, Jr. Post Office Building"	Pub. L. 109–328 (text) (PDF)
109-329	October 12, 2006	(No short title)	An act to designate the facility of the United States Postal Service located at 350 Uinta Drive in Green River, Wyoming, as the "Curt Gowdy Post Office Building"	Pub. L. 109–329 (text) (PDF)
109-330	October 12, 2006	(No short title)	An act to designate the facility of the United States Postal Service located at 6029 Broadmoor Street in Mission, Kansas, as the "Larry Winn, Jr. Post Office Building"	Pub. L. 109–330 (text) (PDF)
109-331	October 12, 2006	(No short title)	An act to designate the United States courthouse to be constructed in Greenville, South Carolina, as the "Carroll A. Campbell, Jr. United States Courthouse"	Pub. L. 109–331 (text) (PDF)
109-332	October 12, 2006	(No short title)	An act to designate the Federal building and United States courthouse located at 221 and 211 West Ferguson Street in Tyler, Texas, as the "William M. Steger Federal Building and United States Courthouse"	Pub. L. 109–332 (text) (PDF)
109-333	October 12, 2006	(No short title)	An act to designate the facility of the United States Postal Service located at 950 Missouri Avenue in East St. Louis, Illinois, as the "Katherine Dunham Post Office Building"	Pub. L. 109–333 (text) (PDF)
109-334	October 12, 2006	(No short title)	An act to designate the facility of the United States Postal Service located at 39-25 61st Street in Woodside, New York, as the "Thomas J. Manton Post Office Building"	Pub. L. 109–334 (text) (PDF)
109-335	October 12, 2006	(No short title)	An act to designate the Federal building and United States courthouse located at 2 South Main Street in Akron, Ohio, as the "John F. Seiberling Federal Building and United States Courthouse"	Pub. L. 109–335 (text) (PDF)
109-336	October 12, 2006	(No short title)	An act to designate the facility of the United States Postal Service located at 101 East Gay Street in West Chester, Pennsylvania, as the "Robert J. Thompson Post Office Building"	Pub. L. 109–336 (text) (PDF)
109-337	October 12, 2006	Rio Grande Natural Area Act	An act to establish the Rio Grande Natural Area in the State of Colorado, and for other purposes	Pub. L. 109–337 (text) (PDF)
109-338	October 12, 2006	National Heritage Areas Act of 2006	An act to reduce temporarily the royalty required to be paid for sodium produced, to establish certain National Heritage Areas, and for other purposes	Pub. L. 109–338 (text) (PDF)
109-339	October 13, 2006	(No short title)	An act to designate the United States courthouse at 300 North Hogan Street, Jacksonville, Florida, as the "John Milton Bryan Simpson United States Courthouse"	Pub. L. 109–339 (text) (PDF)
109-340	October 13, 2006	(No short title)	An act to authorize the Government of Ukraine to establish a memorial on Federal land in the District of Columbia to honor the victims of the manmade famine that occurred in Ukraine in 1932-1933	Pub. L. 109–340 (text) (PDF)
109-341	October 13, 2006	(No short title)	An act to designate a portion of the Federal building located at 2100 Jamieson Avenue, in Alexandria, Virginia, as the "Justin W. Williams United States Attorney's Building"	Pub. L. 109–341 (text) (PDF)
109-342	October 13, 2006	(No short title)	An act to designate a parcel of land located on the site of the Thomas F. Eagleton United States Courthouse in St. Louis, Missouri, as the "Clyde S. Cahill Memorial Park"	Pub. L. 109–342 (text) (PDF)
109-343	October 13, 2006	(No short title)	An act to designate the Federal building located at 320 North Main Street in McAllen, Texas, as the "Kika de la Garza Federal Building"	Pub. L. 109–343 (text) (PDF)
109-344	October 13, 2006	Darfur Peace and Accountability Act of 2006	An act to impose sanctions against individuals responsible for genocide, war crimes, and crimes against humanity, to support measures for the protection of civilians and humanitarian operations, and to support peace efforts in the Darfur region of Sudan, and for other purposes	Pub. L. 109–344 (text) (PDF)
109-345	October 13, 2006	(No short title)	An act to designate the facility of the United States Postal Service located at 777 Corporation Street in Beaver, Pennsylvania, as the "Robert Linn Memorial Post Office Building"	Pub. L. 109–345 (text) (PDF)
109-346	October 13, 2006	(No short title)	An act to designate the facility of the United States Postal Service located at 105 North Quincy Street in Clinton, Illinois, as the "Gene Vance Post Office Building"	Pub. L. 109–346 (text) (PDF)
109-347	October 13, 2006	Safe Port Act: Security and Accountability For Every Port Act of 2006	An act to improve maritime and cargo security through enhanced layered defenses, and for other purposes (including title VIII, Unlawful Internet Gambling Enforcement Act of 2006)	Pub. L. 109–347 (text) (PDF)
109-348	October 13, 2006	(No short title)	An act to designate the Investigations Building of the Food and Drug Administration located at 466 Fernandez Juncos Avenue in San Juan, Puerto Rico, as the "Andres Toro Building"	Pub. L. 109–348 (text) (PDF)
109-349	October 13, 2006	(No short title)	An act to designate the facility of the United States Postal Service located at 202 East Washington Street in Morris, Illinois, as the "Joshua A. Terando Morris Post Office Building"	Pub. L. 109–349 (text) (PDF)
109-350	October 13, 2006	(No short title)	An act to designate the facility of the United States Postal Service located at 40 South Walnut Street in Chillicothe, Ohio, as the "Larry Cox Post Office"	Pub. L. 109–350 (text) (PDF)
109-351	October 13, 2006	(No short title)	An act to provide regulatory relief and improve productivity for insured depository institutions, and for other purposes	Pub. L. 109–351 (text) (PDF)
109-352	October 13, 2006	Wright Amendment Reform Act of 2006	An act to amend section 29 of the International Air Transportation Competition Act of 1979 relating to air transportation to and from Love Field, Texas	Pub. L. 109–352 (text) (PDF)
109-353	October 13, 2006	North Korea Nonproliferation Act of 2006	An act to promote nuclear nonproliferation in North Korea	Pub. L. 109–353 (text) (PDF)
109-354	October 16, 2006	(No short title)	An act to revise the boundaries of John H. Chafee Coastal Barrier Resources System Jekyll Island Unit GA-06P	Pub. L. 109–354 (text) (PDF)
109-355	October 16, 2006	(No short title)	An act to replace a Coastal Barrier Resources System map relating to Coastal Barrier Resources System Grayton Beach Unit FL-95P in Walton County, Florida	Pub. L. 109–355 (text) (PDF)
109-356	October 16, 2006	(No short title)	An act to authorize improvements in the operation of the government of the District of Columbia, and for other purposes	Pub. L. 109–356 (text) (PDF)
109-357	October 16, 2006	Byron Nelson Congressional Gold Medal Act	An act to award a Congressional gold medal to Byron Nelson in recognition of his significant contributions to the game of golf as a player, a teacher, and a commentator	Pub. L. 109–357 (text) (PDF)
109-358	October 16, 2006	Lake Mattamuskeet Lodge Preservation Act	An act to require the conveyance of Mattamuskeet Lodge and surrounding property, including the Mattamuskeet National Wildlife Refuge headquarters, to the State of North Carolina to permit the State to use the property as a public facility dedicated to the conservation of the natural and cultural resources of North Carolina	Pub. L. 109–358 (text) (PDF)
109-359	October 16, 2006	Long Island Sound Stewardship Act of 2006	An act to establish the Long Island Sound Stewardship Initiative	Pub. L. 109–359 (text) (PDF)
109-360	October 16, 2006	National Fish Hatchery System Volunteer Act of 2006	An act to enhance an existing volunteer program of the United States Fish and Wildlife Service and promote community partnerships for the benefit of national fish hatcheries and fisheries program offices	Pub. L. 109–360 (text) (PDF)
109-361	October 16, 2006	Veterans' Compensation Cost-of-Living Adjustment Act of 2006	An act to increase, effective as of December 1, 2006, the rates of compensation for veterans with service-connected disabilities and the rates of dependency and indemnity compensation for the survivors of certain disabled veterans	Pub. L. 109–361 (text) (PDF)
109-362	October 17, 2006	(No short title)	An act to designate certain National Forest System lands in the Mendocino and Six Rivers National Forests and certain Bureau of Land Management lands in Humboldt, Lake, Mendocino, and Napa Counties in the State of California as wilderness, to designate the Elkhorn Ridge Potential Wilderness Area, to designate certain segments of the Black Butte River in Mendocino County, California as a wild or scenic river, and for other purposes	Pub. L. 109–362 (text) (PDF)
109-363	October 17, 2006	(No short title)	An act to direct the Secretary of the Interior to convey the Tylersville division of the Lamar National Fish Hatchery and Fish Technology Center to the State of Pennsylvania, and for other purposes	Pub. L. 109–363 (text) (PDF)
109-364	October 17, 2006	John Warner National Defense Authorization Act for Fiscal Year 2007	An act to authorize appropriations for fiscal year 2007 for military activities of the Department of Defense, for military construction, and for defense activities of the Department of Energy, to prescribe military personnel strengths for such fiscal year, and for other purposes	Pub. L. 109–364 (text) (PDF)
109-365	October 17, 2006	(No short title)	An act to amend the Older Americans Act of 1965 to authorize appropriations for fiscal years 2007 through 2011, and for other purposes	Pub. L. 109–365 (text) (PDF)
109-366	October 17, 2006	Military Commissions Act of 2006	An act to authorize trial by military commission for violations of the law of war, and for other purposes	Pub. L. 109–366 (text) (PDF)
109-367	October 26, 2006	Secure Fence Act of 2006	An act to establish operational control over the international land and maritime borders of the United States	Pub. L. 109–367 (text) (PDF)
109-368	November 17, 2006	(No short title)	An act to clarify the provision of nutrition services to older Americans	Pub. L. 109–368 (text) (PDF)
109-369	November 17, 2006	(No short title)	Joint resolution making further continuing appropriations for the fiscal year 2007, and for other purposes	Pub. L. 109–369 (text) (PDF)
109-370	November 27, 2006	Lower Farmington River and Salmon Brook Wild and Scenic River Study Act of 2005	An act to amend the Wild and Scenic Rivers Act to designate a segment of the Farmington River and Salmon Brook in the State of Connecticut for study for potential addition to the National Wild and Scenic Rivers System, and for other purposes	Pub. L. 109–370 (text) (PDF)
109-371	November 27, 2006	Pactola Reservoir Reallocation Authorization Act of 2005	An act to authorize the Secretary of the Interior to reallocate costs of the Pactola Dam and Reservoir, South Dakota, to reflect increased demands for municipal, industrial, and fish and wildlife purposes	Pub. L. 109–371 (text) (PDF)
109-372	November 27, 2006	Idaho Land Enhancement Act	An act to authorize the exchange of certain Federal land within the State of Idaho, and for other purposes	Pub. L. 109–372 (text) (PDF)
109-373	November 27, 2006	Fort McDowell Indian Community Water Rights Settlement Revision Act of 2006	An act to revise a provision relating to a repayment obligation of the Fort McDowell Yavapai Nation under the Fort McDowell Indian Community Water Rights Settlement Act of 1990, and for other purposes	Pub. L. 109–373 (text) (PDF)
109-374	November 27, 2006	Animal Enterprise Terrorism Act	An act to provide the Department of Justice the necessary authority to apprehend, prosecute, and convict individuals committing animal enterprise terror	Pub. L. 109–374 (text) (PDF)
109-375	December 1, 2006	Sierra National Forest Land Exchange Act of 2006	An act to provide for the exchange of land within the Sierra National Forest, California, and for other purposes	Pub. L. 109–375 (text) (PDF)
109-376	December 1, 2006	(No short title)	An act to provide for the conveyance of the reversionary interest of the United States in certain lands to the Clint Independent School District, El Paso County, Texas	Pub. L. 109–376 (text) (PDF)
109-377	December 1, 2006	Pitkin County Land Exchange Act of 2006	An act to authorize the exchange of certain land in the State of Colorado	Pub. L. 109–377 (text) (PDF)
109-378	December 1, 2006	(No short title)	An act to amend the National Trails System Act to update the feasibility and suitability study originally prepared for the Trail of Tears National Historic Trail and provide for the inclusion of new trail segments, land components, and campgrounds associated with that trail, and for other purposes	Pub. L. 109–378 (text) (PDF)
109-379	December 1, 2006	Pueblo of Isleta Settlement and Natural Resources Restoration Act of 2006	An act to compromise and settle all claims in the case of Pueblo of Isleta v. United States, to restore, improve, and develop the valuable on- reservation land and natural resources of the Pueblo, and for other purposes	Pub. L. 109–379 (text) (PDF)
109-380	December 1, 2006	(No short title)	An act to convey to the town of Frannie, Wyoming, certain land withdrawn by the Commissioner of Reclamation	Pub. L. 109–380 (text) (PDF)
109-381	December 1, 2006	(No short title)	An act to designate the State Route 1 Bridge in the State of Delaware as the "Senator William V. Roth, Jr. Bridge"	Pub. L. 109–381 (text) (PDF)
109-382	December 1, 2006	(No short title)	An act to designate certain land in New England as wilderness for inclusion in the National Wilderness Preservation system and certain land as a National Recreation Area, and for other purposes	Pub. L. 109–382 (text) (PDF)
109-383	December 9, 2006	(No short title)	Joint resolution making further continuing appropriations for the fiscal year 2007, and for other purposes	Pub. L. 109–383 (text) (PDF)
109-384	December 12, 2006	(No short title)	An act to redesignate the facility of the Bureau of Reclamation located at 19550 Kelso Road in Byron, California, as the "C.W. 'Bill' Jones Pumping Plant"	Pub. L. 109–384 (text) (PDF)
109-385	December 12, 2006	Valle Vidal Protection Act of 2005	An act to withdraw the Valle Vidal Unit of the Carson National Forest in New Mexico from location, entry, and patent under the mining laws, and for other purposes	Pub. L. 109–385 (text) (PDF)
109-386	December 12, 2006	(No short title)	An act to authorize the Secretary of the Interior to revise certain repayment contracts with the Bostwick Irrigation District in Nebraska, the Kansas Bostwick Irrigation District No. 2, the Frenchman-Cambridge Irrigation District, and the Webster Irrigation District No. 4, all a part of the Pick-Sloan Missouri Basin Program, and for other purposes	Pub. L. 109–386 (text) (PDF)
109-387	December 12, 2006	(No short title)	An act to provide for the conveyance of certain National Forest System land to the towns of Laona and Wabeno, Wisconsin, and for other purposes	Pub. L. 109–387 (text) (PDF)
109-388	December 12, 2006	Paint Bank and Wytheville National Fish Hatcheries Conveyance Act	An act to direct the Secretary of the Interior to convey Paint Bank National Fish Hatchery and Wytheville National Fish Hatchery to the State of Virginia	Pub. L. 109–388 (text) (PDF)
109-389	December 12, 2006	(No short title)	An act to provide for the conveyance of the former Konnarock Lutheran Girls School in Smyth County, Virginia which is currently owned by the United States and administered by the Forest Service, to facilitate the restoration and reuse of the property, and for other purposes	Pub. L. 109–389 (text) (PDF)
109-390	December 12, 2006	Financial Netting Improvements Act of 2006	An act to improve the netting process for financial contracts, and for other purposes	Pub. L. 109–390 (text) (PDF)
109-391	December 12, 2006	Ouachita National Forest Boundary Adjustment Act of 2006	An act to adjust the boundaries of the Ouachita National Forest in the States of Oklahoma and Arkansas	Pub. L. 109–391 (text) (PDF)
109-392	December 12, 2006	(No short title)	An act to amend the Federal Water Pollution Control Act to reauthorize a program relating to the Lake Pontchartrain Basin, and for other purposes	Pub. L. 109–392 (text) (PDF)
109-393	December 13, 2006	(No short title)	An act to extend the time required for construction of a hydroelectric project, and for other purposes	Pub. L. 109–393 (text) (PDF)
109-394	December 14, 2006	Esther Martinez Native American Languages Preservation Act of 2006	An act to amend the Native American Programs Act of 1974 to provide for the revitalization of Native American languages through Native American language immersion programs; and for other purposes	Pub. L. 109–394 (text) (PDF)
109-395	December 14, 2006	Congressional Tribute to Dr. Norman E. Borlaug Act of 2006	An act to award a congressional gold medal to Dr. Norman E. Borlaug	Pub. L. 109–395 (text) (PDF)
109-396	December 15, 2006	Federal and District of Columbia Government Real Property Act of 2006	An act to provide for the sale, acquisition, conveyance, and exchange of certain real property in the District of Columbia to facilitate the utilization, development, and redevelopment of such property, and for other purposes	Pub. L. 109–396 (text) (PDF)
109-397	December 18, 2006	(No short title)	An act to designate the facility of the United States Postal Service located at 167 East 124th Street in New York, New York, as the "Tito Puente Post Office Building"	Pub. L. 109–397 (text) (PDF)
109-398	December 18, 2006	(No short title)	An act to designate the facility of the United States Postal Service located at 8135 Forest Lane in Dallas, Texas, as the "Dr. Robert E. Price Post Office Building"	Pub. L. 109–398 (text) (PDF)
109-399	December 18, 2006	(No short title)	An act to designate the facility of the United States Postal Service located at 200 Gateway Drive in Lincoln, California, as the "Beverly J. Wilson Post Office Building"	Pub. L. 109–399 (text) (PDF)
109-400	December 18, 2006	(No short title)	An act to designate the facility of the United States Postal Service located at 1213 East Houston Street in Cleveland, Texas, as the "Lance Corporal Robert A. Martinez Post Office Building"	Pub. L. 109–400 (text) (PDF)
109-401	December 18, 2006	(No short title)	An act to exempt from certain requirements of the Atomic Energy Act of 1954 a proposed nuclear agreement for cooperation with India	Pub. L. 109–401 (text) (PDF)
109-402	December 18, 2006	(No short title)	An act to designate the facility of the United States Postal Service located at 101 Palafox Place in Pensacola, Florida, as the "Vincent J. Whibbs, Sr. Post Office Building"	Pub. L. 109–402 (text) (PDF)
109-403	December 18, 2006	(No short title)	An act to designate the facility of the United States Postal Service located at 1501 South Cherrybell Avenue in Tucson, Arizona, as the "Morris K. 'Mo' Udall Post Office Building"	Pub. L. 109–403 (text) (PDF)
109-404	December 18, 2006	(No short title)	An act to designate the facility of the United States Postal Service located at 29-50 Union Street in Flushing, New York, as the "Dr. Leonard Price Stavisky Post Office"	Pub. L. 109–404 (text) (PDF)
109-405	December 18, 2006	(No short title)	An act to designate the facility of the United States Postal Service located at 10240 Roosevelt Road in Westchester, Illinois, as the "John J. Sinde Post Office Building"	Pub. L. 109–405 (text) (PDF)
109-406	December 18, 2006	(No short title)	An act to designate the facility of the United States Postal Service located at 415 South 5th Avenue in Maywood, Illinois, as the "Wallace W. Sykes Post Office Building"	Pub. L. 109–406 (text) (PDF)
109-407	December 18, 2006	(No short title)	An act to designate the facility of the United States Postal Service located at 307 West Wheat Street in Woodville, Texas, as the "Chuck Fortenberry Post Office Building"	Pub. L. 109–407 (text) (PDF)
109-408	December 18, 2006	(No short title)	An act to designate the facility of the United States Postal Service located at 200 Lawyers Road, NW in Vienna, Virginia, as the "Captain Christopher P. Petty and Major William F. Hecker, III Post Office Building"	Pub. L. 109–408 (text) (PDF)
109-409	December 18, 2006	(No short title)	An act to designate the facility of the United States Postal Service located at 216 Oak Street in Farmington, Minnesota, as the "Hamilton H. Judson Post Office"	Pub. L. 109–409 (text) (PDF)
109-410	December 18, 2006	(No short title)	An act to authorize certain tribes in the State of Montana to enter into a lease or other temporary conveyance of water rights to meet the water needs of the Dry Prairie Rural Water Association, Inc	Pub. L. 109–410 (text) (PDF)
109-411	December 18, 2006	(No short title)	An act to designate the facility of the United States Postal Service located at 6110 East 51st Place in Tulsa, Oklahoma, as the "Dewey F. Bartlett Post Office"	Pub. L. 109–411 (text) (PDF)
109-412	December 18, 2006	(No short title)	An act to name the Armed Forces Readiness Center in Great Falls, Montana, in honor of Captain William Wylie Galt, a recipient of the Congressional Medal of Honor	Pub. L. 109–412 (text) (PDF)
109-413	December 18, 2006	(No short title)	An act to designate the facility of the United States Postal Service located at 103 East Thompson Street in Thomaston, Georgia, as the "Sergeant First Class Robert Lee 'Bobby' Hollar, Jr. Post Office Building"	Pub. L. 109–413 (text) (PDF)
109-414	December 18, 2006	(No short title)	An act to designate the outpatient clinic of the Department of Veterans Affairs located in Farmington, Missouri, as the "Robert Silvey Department of Veterans Affairs Outpatient Clinic"	Pub. L. 109–414 (text) (PDF)
109-415	December 19, 2006	Ryan White HIV/AIDS Treatment Modernization Act of 2006	An act to amend title XXVI of the Public Health Service Act to revise and extend the program for providing life-saving care for those with HIV/AIDS	Pub. L. 109–415 (text) (PDF)
109-416	December 19, 2006	Combating Autism Act of 2006	An act to amend the Public Health Service Act to combat autism through research, screening, intervention and education	Pub. L. 109–416 (text) (PDF)
109-417	December 19, 2006	Pandemic and All-Hazards Preparedness Act	An act to amend the Public Health Service Act with respect to public health security and all-hazards preparedness and response, and for other purposes	Pub. L. 109–417 (text) (PDF)
109-418	December 19, 2006	Captain John Smith Chesapeake National Historic Trail Designation Act	An act to amend the National Trails System Act to designate the Captain John Smith Chesapeake National Historic Trail	Pub. L. 109–418 (text) (PDF)
109-419	December 20, 2006	(No short title)	An act to direct the Secretary of the Interior to conduct a boundary study to evaluate the significance of the Colonel James Barrett Farm in the Commonwealth of Massachusetts and the suitability and feasibility of its inclusion in the National Park System as part of the Minute Man National Historical Park, and for other purposes	Pub. L. 109–419 (text) (PDF)
109-420	December 20, 2006	(No short title)	An act to establish an interagency aerospace revitalization task force to develop a national strategy for aerospace workforce recruitment, training, and cultivation	Pub. L. 109–420 (text) (PDF)
109-421	December 20, 2006	(No short title)	An act to provide for certain lands to be held in trust for the Utu Utu Gwaitu Paiute Tribe	Pub. L. 109–421 (text) (PDF)
109-422	December 20, 2006	Sober Truth on Preventing Underage Drinking Act	An act to provide for programs and activities with respect to the prevention of underage drinking	Pub. L. 109–422 (text) (PDF)
109-423	December 20, 2006	Nursing Relief for Disadvantaged Areas Reauthorization Act of 2005	An act to extend for 3 years changes to requirements for admission of nonimmigrant nurses in health professional shortage areas made by the Nursing Relief for Disadvantaged Areas Act of 1999	Pub. L. 109–423 (text) (PDF)
109-424	December 20, 2006	Tsunami Warning and Education Act	An act to authorize and strengthen the tsunami detection, forecast, warning, and mitigation program of the National Oceanic and Atmospheric Administration, to be carried out by the National Weather Service, and for other purposes	Pub. L. 109–424 (text) (PDF)
109-425	December 20, 2006	(No short title)	An act to provide that attorneys employed by the Department of Justice shall be eligible for compensatory time off for travel under section 5550b of title 5, United States Code	Pub. L. 109–425 (text) (PDF)
109-426	December 20, 2006	(No short title)	An act to reauthorize permanently the use of penalty and franked mail in efforts relating to the location and recovery of missing children	Pub. L. 109–426 (text) (PDF)
109-427	December 20, 2006	(No short title)	An act to direct the Joint Committee on the Library to accept the donation of a bust depicting Sojourner Truth and to display the bust in a suitable location in the Capitol	Pub. L. 109–427 (text) (PDF)
109-428	December 20, 2006	Wool Suit Fabric Labeling Fairness and International Standards Conforming Act	An act to amend the Wool Products Labeling Act of 1939 to revise the requirements for labeling of certain wool and cashmere products	Pub. L. 109–428 (text) (PDF)
109-429	December 20, 2006	River Raisin National Battlefield Study Act	An act to direct the Secretary of the Interior to conduct a special resource study to determine the suitability and feasibility of including in the National Park System certain sites in Monroe County, Michigan relating to the Battles of the River Raisin during the War of 1812	Pub. L. 109–429 (text) (PDF)
109-430	December 20, 2006	National Integrated Drought Information System Act of 2006	An act to establish a National Integrated Drought Information System within the National Oceanic and Atmospheric Administration to improve drought monitoring and forecasting capabilities	Pub. L. 109–430 (text) (PDF)
109-431	December 20, 2006	(No short title)	An act to study and promote the use of energy efficient computer servers in the United States	Pub. L. 109–431 (text) (PDF)
109-432	December 20, 2006	Tax Relief and Health Care Act of 2006	An act to amend the Internal Revenue Code of 1986 to extend expiring provisions, and for other purposes	Pub. L. 109–432 (text) (PDF)
109-433	December 20, 2006	(No short title)	An act to permit certain expenditures from the Leaking Underground Storage Tank Trust Fund	Pub. L. 109–433 (text) (PDF)
109-434	December 20, 2006	(No short title)	An act to extend through December 31, 2008, the authority of the Secretary of the Army to accept and expend funds contributed by non-Federal public entities to expedite the processing of permits	Pub. L. 109–434 (text) (PDF)
109-435	December 20, 2006	Postal Accountability and Enhancement Act	An act to reform the postal laws of the United States, which in part forces the USPS to set aside a total of 75 years' worth of pension funds ahead of time	Pub. L. 109–435 (text) (PDF)
109-436	December 20, 2006	Michigan Lighthouse and Maritime Heritage Act	An act to direct the Secretary of the Interior to conduct a study of maritime sites in the State of Michigan	Pub. L. 109–436 (text) (PDF)
109-437	December 20, 2006	Stolen Valor Act of 2005	An act to amend title 18, United States Code, to enhance protections relating to the reputation and meaning of the Medal of Honor and other military decorations and awards, and for other purposes	Pub. L. 109–437 (text) (PDF)
109-438	December 20, 2006	(No short title)	An act to reauthorize the Export-Import Bank of the United States	Pub. L. 109–438 (text) (PDF)
109-439	December 20, 2006	Religious Liberty and Charitable Donation Clarification Act of 2006	An act to clarify the treatment of certain charitable contributions under title 11, United States Code	Pub. L. 109–439 (text) (PDF)
109-440	December 20, 2006	Iraq Reconstruction Accountability Act of 2006	An act to extend oversight and accountability related to United States reconstruction funds and efforts in Iraq by extending the termination date of the Office of the Special Inspector General for Iraq Reconstruction	Pub. L. 109–440 (text) (PDF)
109-441	December 21, 2006	(No short title)	An act to provide for the preservation of the historic confinement sites where Japanese Americans were detained during World War II, and for other purposes	Pub. L. 109–441 (text) (PDF)
109-442	December 21, 2006	Lifespan Respite Care Act of 2006	An act to amend the Public Health Service Act to establish a program to assist family caregivers in accessing affordable and high-quality respite care, and for other purposes	Pub. L. 109–442 (text) (PDF)
109-443	December 21, 2006	(No short title)	An act to amend title 49, United States Code, to authorize appropriations for fiscal years 2007 and 2008, and for other purposes	Pub. L. 109–443 (text) (PDF)
109-444	December 21, 2006	(No short title)	An act to amend title 38, United States Code, to extend certain expiring provisions of law administered by the Secretary of Veterans Affairs, to expand eligibility for the Survivors' and Dependents' Educational Assistance program, and for other purposes	Pub. L. 109–444 (text) (PDF)
109-445	December 21, 2006	Fallen Firefighters Assistance Tax Clarification Act of 2006	An act to treat payments by charitable organizations with respect to certain firefighters as exempt payments	Pub. L. 109–445 (text) (PDF)
109-446	December 21, 2006	Palestinian Anti-Terrorism Act of 2006	An act to promote the development of democratic institutions in areas under the administrative control of the Palestinian Authority, and for other purposes	Pub. L. 109–446 (text) (PDF)
109-447	December 22, 2006	(No short title)	Joint resolution appointing the day for the convening of the first session of the One Hundred Tenth Congress. Spoiler alert! It's January 4, 2007.	Pub. L. 109–447 (text) (PDF)
109-448	December 22, 2006	United States-Mexico Transboundary Aquifer Assessment Act	An act to authorize the Secretary of the Interior to cooperate with the States on the border with Mexico and other appropriate entities in conducting a hydrogeologic characterization, mapping, and modeling program for priority transboundary aquifers, and for other purposes	Pub. L. 109–448 (text) (PDF)
109-449	December 22, 2006	Marine Debris Research, Prevention, and Reduction Act	An act to establish a program within the National Oceanic and Atmospheric Administration and the United States Coast Guard to help identify, determine sources of, assess, reduce, and prevent marine debris and its adverse impacts on the marine environment and navigation safety, in coordination with non-Federal entities, and for other purposes	Pub. L. 109–449 (text) (PDF)
109-450	December 22, 2006	Prematurity Research Expansion and Education for Mothers who deliver Infants Early Act	An act to reduce preterm labor and delivery and the risk of pregnancy-related deaths and complications due to pregnancy, and to reduce infant mortality caused by prematurity	Pub. L. 109–450 (text) (PDF)
109-451	December 22, 2006	Rural Water Supply Act of 2006	An act to authorize the Secretary of the Interior to carry out a rural water supply program in the Reclamation States to provide a clean, safe, affordable, and reliable water supply to rural residents	Pub. L. 109–451 (text) (PDF)
109-452	December 22, 2006	Musconetcong Wild and Scenic Rivers Act	An act to amend the Wild and Scenic Rivers Act to designate portions of the Musconetcong River in the State of New Jersey as a component of the National Wild and Scenic Rivers System, and for other purposes	Pub. L. 109–452 (text) (PDF)
109-453	December 22, 2006	National Historic Preservation Act Amendments Act of 2006	An act to amend the National Historic Preservation Act to provide appropriation authorization and improve the operations of the Advisory Council on Historic Preservation	Pub. L. 109–453 (text) (PDF)
109-454	December 22, 2006	City of Yuma Improvement Act	An act to provide for the conveyance of certain Federal land in the city of Yuma, Arizona	Pub. L. 109–454 (text) (PDF)
109-455	December 22, 2006	Undertaking Spam, Spyware, And Fraud Enforcement With Enforcers beyond Borders Act of 2006 (U.S. SAFE WEB Act)	An act to enhance Federal Trade Commission enforcement against illegal spam, spyware, and cross-border fraud and deception, and for other purposes	Pub. L. 109–455 (text) (PDF)
109-456	December 22, 2006	Democratic Republic of the Congo Relief, Security, and Democracy Promotion Act of 2006	An act to promote relief, security, and democracy in the Democratic Republic of the Congo	Pub. L. 109–456 (text) (PDF)
109-457	December 22, 2006	Eugene Land Conveyance Act	An act to direct the Secretary of Interior to convey certain Bureau of Land Management land to the City of Eugene, Oregon	Pub. L. 109–457 (text) (PDF)
109-458	December 22, 2006	Blunt Reservoir and Pierre Canal Land Conveyance Act of 2006	An act to direct the Secretary of the Interior to convey certain parcels of land acquired for the Blunt Reservoir and Pierre Canal features of the initial stage of the Oahe Unit, James Division, South Dakota, to the Commission of Schools and Public Lands and the Department of Game, Fish, and Parks of the State of South Dakota for the purpose of mitigating lost wildlife habitat, on the condition that the current preferential leaseholders shall have an option to purchase the parcels from the Commission, and for other purposes	Pub. L. 109–458 (text) (PDF)
109-459	December 22, 2006	Call Home Act of 2006	An act to direct the Federal Communications Commission to make efforts to reduce telephone rates for Armed Forces personnel deployed overseas	Pub. L. 109–459 (text) (PDF)
109-460	December 22, 2006	(No short title)	An act to amend the National Dam Safety Program Act to reauthorize the national dam safety program, and for other purposes	Pub. L. 109–460 (text) (PDF)
109-461	December 22, 2006	Veterans Benefits, Health Care, and Information Technology Act of 2006	An act to amend title 38, United States Code, to repeal certain limitations on attorney representation of claimants for benefits under laws administered by the Secretary of Veterans Affairs, to expand eligibility for the Survivors' and Dependents' Educational Assistance Program, to otherwise improve veterans' benefits, memorial affairs, and health-care programs, to enhance information security programs of the Department of Veterans Affairs, and for other purposes	Pub. L. 109–461 (text) (PDF)
109-462	December 22, 2006	Dietary Supplement and Nonprescription Drug Consumer Protection Act	An act to amend the Federal Food, Drug, and Cosmetic Act with respect to serious adverse event reporting for dietary supplements and nonprescription drugs, and for other purposes	Pub. L. 109–462 (text) (PDF)
109-463	December 22, 2006	(No short title)	An act to authorize certain athletes to be admitted temporarily into the United States to compete or perform in an athletic league, competition, or performance	Pub. L. 109–463 (text) (PDF)
109-464	December 22, 2006	(No short title)	An act to amend title 18, United States Code, to prohibit disruptions of funerals of members or former members of the Armed Forces	Pub. L. 109–464 (text) (PDF)
109-465	December 22, 2006	Social Security Trust Funds Restoration Act of 2006	An act to provide authority for restoration of the Social Security Trust Funds from the effects of a clerical error, and for other purposes	Pub. L. 109–465 (text) (PDF)
109-466	December 22, 2006	(No short title)	An act to clarify certain land use in Jefferson County, Colorado	Pub. L. 109–466 (text) (PDF)
109-467	December 22, 2006	(No short title)	An act to amend the Farm Security and Rural Investment Act of 2002 to extend a suspension of limitation on the period for which certain borrowers are eligible for guaranteed assistance	Pub. L. 109–467 (text) (PDF)
109-468	December 29, 2006	Pipeline Inspection, Protection, Enforcement, and Safety Act of 2006	An act to amend title 49, United States Code, to provide for enhanced safety and environmental protection in pipeline transportation, to provide for enhanced reliability in the transportation of the Nation's energy products by pipeline, and for other purposes	Pub. L. 109–468 (text) (PDF)
109-469	December 29, 2006	Office of National Drug Control Policy Reauthorization Act of 2006	An act to reauthorize the Office of National Drug Control Policy Act	Pub. L. 109–469 (text) (PDF)
109-470	January 11, 2007	Holloman Air Force Base Land Exchange Act	An act to provide for a land exchange involving private land and Bureau of Land Management land in the vicinity of Holloman Air Force Base, New Mexico, for the purpose of removing private land from the required safety zone surrounding munitions storage bunkers at Holloman Air Force Base	Pub. L. 109–470 (text) (PDF)
109-471	January 11, 2007	Water Resources Research Act Amendments of 2006	An act to reauthorize grants for and require applied water supply research regarding the water resources research and technology institutes established under the Water Resources Research Act of 1984	Pub. L. 109–471 (text) (PDF)
109-472	January 11, 2007	(No short title)	An act to authorize certain activities by the Department of State, and for other purposes	Pub. L. 109–472 (text) (PDF)
109-473	January 11, 2007	(No short title)	An act to make a conforming amendment to the Federal Deposit Insurance Act with respect to examinations of certain insured depository institutions, and for other purposes	Pub. L. 109–473 (text) (PDF)
109-474	January 12, 2007	Pine Springs Land Exchange Act	An act to provide for a land exchange involving Federal lands in the Lincoln National Forest in the State of New Mexico, and for other purposes	Pub. L. 109–474 (text) (PDF)
109-475	January 12, 2007	Gynecologic Cancer Education and Awareness Act of 2005	An act to provide for programs to increase the awareness and knowledge of women and health care providers with respect to gynecologic cancers	Pub. L. 109–475 (text) (PDF)
109-476	January 12, 2007	Telephone Records and Privacy Protection Act of 2006	An act to amend title 18, United States Code, to strengthen protections for law enforcement officers and the public by providing criminal penalties for the fraudulent acquisition or unauthorized disclosure of phone records	Pub. L. 109–476 (text) (PDF)
109-477	January 12, 2007	Physicians for Underserved Areas Act	An act to extend for 2 years the authority to grant waivers of the foreign country residence requirement with respect to certain international medical graduates	Pub. L. 109–477 (text) (PDF)
109-478	January 12, 2007	Railroad Retirement Disability Earnings Act	An act to increase the disability earning limitation under the Railroad Retirement Act and to index the amount of allowable earnings consistent with increases in the substantial gainful activity dollar amount under the Social Security Act	Pub. L. 109–478 (text) (PDF)
109-479	January 12, 2007	Magnuson-Stevens Fishery Conservation and Management Reauthorization Act of 2006	An act to amend the Magnuson-Stevens Fishery Conservation and Management Act to authorize activities to promote improved monitoring and compliance for high seas fisheries, or fisheries governed by international fishery management agreements, and for other purposes	Pub. L. 109–479 (text) (PDF)
109-480	January 12, 2007	Belarus Democracy Reauthorization Act of 2006	An act to reauthorize the Belarus Democracy Act of 2004	Pub. L. 109–480 (text) (PDF)
109-481	January 12, 2007	Geneva Distinctive Emblems Protection Act of 2006	An act to amend title 18, United States Code, to prevent and repress the misuse of the Red Crescent distinctive emblem and the Third Protocol (Red Crystal) distinctive emblem	Pub. L. 109–481 (text) (PDF)
109-482	January 15, 2007	National Institutes of Health Reform Act of 2006	An act to amend title IV of the Public Health Service Act to revise and extend the authorities of the National Institutes of Health, and for other purposes	Pub. L. 109–482 (text) (PDF)

== Private laws ==
Private law number (Linked to Wikisource)	Date of enactment	Official short title	Description	Citation
109-1	May 12, 2006	Betty Dick Residence Protection Act	An act to require the Secretary of the Interior to allow the continued occupancy and use of certain land and improvements within Rocky Mountain National Park	120 Stat. 3705

== Treaties ==
No treaties were ratified during this Congress.

== See also ==
- List of United States federal legislation
- List of acts of the 108th United States Congress
- List of acts of the 110th United States Congress
