= RSAT =

RSAT may refer to the following:

- Runway Awareness and Advisory System
- Repair Satellite Prototype
- Office of Regional Security and Arms Transfers in the U.S. Department of State
