= Global Food Security Act of 2016 =

- Enacted by: the 114th United States Congress

Citations
- Public law: Pub. L. 114–195 (text) (PDF)

Codification
- Acts amended: Foreign Assistance Act of 1961
- Titles amended: 22 U.S.C.: Foreign Relations and Intercourse
- U.S.C. sections amended: 22 U.S.C. ch. 32 2151a, 2151a–1, 2220a et seq., and 2346 et seq.

Legislative history
- Introduced in the Senate by Bob Casey Jr. (D-PA) on May 7, 2015; Committee consideration by United States Senate Committee on Foreign Relations; Passed the Senate on May 7, 2016 (Voice); Passed the House on July 6, 2016 (369-53); Signed into law by President Barack Obama on July 20, 2016

The Global Food Security Act of 2016 (Pub. L. 114–195 (text) (PDF)), is a law introduced on March 24, 2015, in the 114th Congress by Representative Christopher Henry "Chris" Smith (New Jersey-R) and on May 7, 2015, by Senator Robert Patrick "Bob" Casey Jr. (Pennsylvania-D), and signed by President Barack Obama on July 20, 2016.

The law authorizes a comprehensive, strategic approach for United States foreign assistance to developing countries to reduce global poverty and hunger, achieve food security and improved nutrition, promote inclusive, sustainable agricultural-led economic growth, improve nutritional outcomes, especially for women and children, build resilience among vulnerable populations, and for other purposes.

This law has been endorsed by a number of humanitarian organizations, including Oxfam, Food for the Hungry, Bread for the World, The Borgen Project and the ONE Campaign.

== See also ==
- Poverty
- International Aid
- International Development
- Millennium Development Goals
- Sustainable Development Goals
- Feed the Future Initiative
