= Johanna's Law =

2007 US law

The United States Congress Senate Appropriations Committee hearing for information on Johanna's Law in Washington, D.C., in the 109th Congress during the 1st session, May 11, 2005.

Johanna's Law, also known as the Gynecologic Cancer Education and Awareness Act, (Pub. L. 109–475 (text) (PDF)) is a US law that promotes the education of women to increase awareness of gynecologic cancer. Gynecologic cancers include ovarian, uterine/endometrial, cervical, vaginal, and vulvar cancers and the risk factors and symptoms. These cancers are often very advanced before detection. Increased awareness could lead to earlier detection and reduced morbidity that could save lives.

It was named after a schoolteacher, Johanna Silver Gordon, who died of ovarian cancer in 2000, aged 58.

== Background ==
The law allowed the Centers for Disease Control and Prevention to facilitate a national campaign that focused on raising awareness of gynecologic cancers. The law originally asked for $45 million for 2006 to 2008 but was authorized $16.5 million over the course of the 2007 to 2009 fiscal years (Pub. L. 109–475 (text) (PDF)). The goal of the campaign was to produce and maintain a supply of materials available to public on gynecologic cancers upon request and release public service announcements to call attention to early warning signs and risk factors.The law was later reauthorized for $18 million over the course of the 2012 to 2014 fiscal years.

Senators Arlen Specter and Tom Harkin introduced the Bill in the Senate on June 6, 2005. Senator Barack Obama co-sponsored it. It passed both houses of Congress unanimously and was signed into law on January 12, 2007, by George W. Bush.

United States Centers for Disease Control and Prevention logo, February 25, 2001. (Courtesy of the Centers for Disease Control and Prevention)

== Inside Knowledge campaign ==
Johanna's Law led to the "Inside Knowledge" national campaign launched in 2009 with the goal of raising women's and healthcare providers' awareness and knowledge of gynecological cancers, warning signs and risk factors. By April 2013, more than 1.4 million materials had been used from the website.

=== Key campaign messages ===
- Treatment is most effective when gynecologic cancers are found early.
- Women should see a doctor right away if they experience vaginal bleeding that is unusual for them.
- Regular screenings can prevent cervical cancer or help find it early.
- Human papillomavirus (HPV) is the leading cause of cervical, vaginal and vulvar cancers. Women who fall into the recommended age group should consider receiving the HPV vaccine.
- A family history of ovarian cancer can increase a person's risk.
- Other risk factors include being obese, taking estrogen, a family history of uterine, ovarian or colon cancers and being over the age of 50.

A poster from the "Inside Knowledge Campaign" launched in 2009 for gynecological cancer awareness, available for public use from the United States Department of Health and Human Services, Centers for Disease Control and Prevention. (Courtesy of the Inside Knowledge Campaign)

The campaign targeted women of all races, ages and ethnic groups, especially those over 35, and healthcare providers. It still offers a wide variety of fact sheets and posters as well as public service announcements available upon request. The PSAs for social media and television use hypothetical scenarios to encourage women to reach out to their gynecologists with questions.
