= Foreign Assistance Act =

1961 U.S. federal law governing aid

Foreign Assistance Act (1961)
- Other short titles: Act for International Development of 1961; Foreign Aid Authorization Act of 1961
- Long title: An Act to promote the foreign policy, security, and general welfare of the United States by assisting peoples of the world in their efforts toward economic and social development and internal and external security, and for other purposes.
- Nicknames: Foreign Assistance Act of 1961
- Enacted by: the 87th United States Congress
- Effective: September 4, 1961

Citations
- Public law: 87-195
- Statutes at Large: 75 Stat. 424-2

Codification
- Titles amended: 22 U.S.C.: Foreign Relations and Intercourse
- U.S.C. sections created: 22 U.S.C. ch. 32 § 2151

Legislative history
- Introduced in the Senate as S. 1983 by J. William Fulbright (D–AR) on May 26, 1961; Committee consideration by Senate Foreign Relations, House Foreign Affairs; Passed the Senate on August 18, 1961 (66–24); Passed the House on August 18, 1961 (287–140, in lieu of H.R. 8400); Reported by the joint conference committee on August 31, 1961; agreed to by the Senate on August 31, 1961 (69–24) and by the House on August 31, 1961 (260–132); Signed into law by President John F. Kennedy on September 4, 1961

Major amendments
- Foreign Assistance Act of 1974; Global Food Security Act of 2016

The Foreign Assistance Act (Pub. L. 87–195, 75 Stat. 424-2, enacted September 4, 1961, 22 U.S.C. § 2151 et seq.) is a United States federal law that provides the basic statutory framework for most U.S. foreign assistance and security assistance programs. The Act reorganized the patchwork of foreign aid authorities created after World War II, repealed the Mutual Security Act of 1954, and consolidated economic and military assistance under a single legislative framework, codified mainly in chapter 32 of title 22 of the United States Code. It was passed by Congress in August 1961 and signed into law by President John F. Kennedy on September 4,1961.

The Act set out broad development and security objectives, calling for a “long-range and interrelated” strategy to promote economic growth, political independence, and internal and external security in partner countries. It directed the president to establish a new agency to administer nonmilitary economic and technical assistance. Pursuant to this authority, Kennedy issued Executive Order 10973 on November 3, 1961, delegating foreign assistance functions to the Secretary of State and providing for the establishment of the Agency for International Development (AID, now the USAID) as the principal administrator of economic assistance programs.

Since 1961 the Foreign Assistance Act has been extensively amended to reflect changing U.S. foreign policy priorities. Major amendments added human-rights conditions on aid, restructured security assistance, and created or updated authorities related to child survival, HIV/AIDS, and global food security, among other areas. These changes include the Foreign Assistance Act of 1974, which added sections 116 and 502B on human rights, the Assistance for Orphans and Other Vulnerable Children in Developing Countries Act of 2005, and the Global Food Security Act of 2016.

== Synopsis ==
The Foreign Assistance Act repealed the Mutual Security Act and authorized a comprehensive reorganization of U.S. foreign aid institutions. The Act empowered the president to abolish the existing International Cooperation Administration (ICA) and Development Loan Fund (DLF) and to establish a new agency to administer economic assistance. Under Executive Order 10973 and related delegations, the Agency for International Development was created in late 1961 to succeed the ICA and DLF and to take over certain functions of the Export–Import Bank and the Department of Agriculture’s Food for Peace program.

USAID unified several existing U.S. aid efforts, combining the economic and technical assistance operations of the ICA, the loan activities of the DLF, selected local-currency finance functions previously handled by the Export–Import Bank, and the overseas agricultural surplus distribution activities of the Food for Peace program of the Department of Agriculture.

As enacted, the Foreign Assistance Act was organized into multiple parts. Part I set out policy, definitions, and authorizations for development assistance in sectors such as agriculture, education, health, public administration, and private enterprise, while Part II authorized military assistance, training, and related security support programs. Part III contained general and administrative provisions, including numerous limitations and conditions on aid.

Over time Congress has used the Act as the principal authorization for a wide range of bilateral assistance accounts funded through annual State–Foreign Operations appropriations acts, including Development Assistance, the Economic Support Fund (ESF), Global Health Programs, International Disaster Assistance, and other accounts supporting development, humanitarian, and security cooperation programs worldwide. In recent decades these programs have collectively provided tens of billions of dollars annually in U.S. foreign assistance.

The Act provides that no security assistance is to be furnished to any government that "engages in a consistent pattern of gross violations of internationally recognized human rights, including torture or cruel, inhuman, or degrading treatment or punishment, prolonged detention without charges, causing the disappearance of persons by the abduction and clandestine detention of those persons, or other flagrant denial of the right to life, liberty, and the security of person," unless such assistance will directly benefit needy people in that country. These human-rights conditions, largely added by the Foreign Assistance Act of 1974, are reflected in sections 116 and 502B of the Act.

The Act also contains a set of country-specific and ideological restrictions. Section 620(f) (now codified primarily at 22 U.S.C. 2370) originally provided that no assistance shall be furnished under the Act to any Communist country, but permitted the president to waive this prohibition if he determined that such assistance was vital to the national security of the United States, that the recipient was not controlled by the "international Communist conspiracy," and that the assistance would promote the country’s independence from international communism. The president is required to determine and report to Congress when a country is removed from the application of this provision.

In 2005 Congress enacted the Assistance for Orphans and Other Vulnerable Children in Developing Countries Act of 2005, which amended the Foreign Assistance Act by adding section 135 (22 U.S.C. 2152f). The provision authorizes the president, acting through USAID and other agencies, to provide assistance to improve the care of orphans and other vulnerable children affected by HIV/AIDS and other factors, including support for education, health, and community-based care programs.

Section 506(a)(1) of the Act (22 U.S.C. 2318) provides the president with "drawdown" authority to transfer defense articles and services from U.S. stocks to foreign countries in emergency situations. On March 16, 2022, President Joe Biden used this authority to authorize $800 million in additional security assistance to Ukraine, including anti-armor systems, air defense systems, and small arms, as part of the U.S. response to the Russian invasion of Ukraine.

On December 14, 2023, Senator Bernie Sanders introduced a privileged resolution under section 502B(c) of the Foreign Assistance Act, calling on the U.S. Department of State to report on Israel’s human-rights practices and the use of U.S. security assistance in the 2023–2024 Israel–Hamas war. The resolution would have required the State Department to submit a report within 30 days assessing whether Israel was engaging in violations of internationally recognized human rights and international humanitarian law and would have frozen most U.S. military aid to Israel until the report was delivered. On January 16, 2024, the Senate voted 72–11 to table the measure. In March 2024, Sanders and seven other U.S. senators sent a letter to President Biden arguing that continued arms transfers to Israel without adequate humanitarian access risked violating provisions of the Foreign Assistance Act that bar providing security assistance to governments that restrict U.S.-supported humanitarian aid.

== Excess defense articles ==
Section 644(g) of the Foreign Assistance Act (codified at 22 U.S.C. § 2403) defines "excess defense articles" (EDA) as U.S. Department of Defense or Coast Guard–owned defense articles that are no longer needed for U.S. requirements and have been declared excess by the U.S. Armed Forces. Under the Act and related authorities, such equipment may be offered at reduced or no cost to eligible foreign recipients on an “as is, where is” basis in support of U.S. national security and foreign policy objectives.

The Defense Security Cooperation Agency (DSCA) administers the EDA program as part of U.S. security cooperation efforts, in coordination with the Department of State’s Office of Regional Security and Arms Transfers and the U.S. Department of Commerce’s Bureau of Industry and Security. Section 516 of the Act (22 U.S.C. 2321j) provides the basic authority to transfer excess defense articles and requires that such transfers not adversely affect the U.S. national technology and industrial base or significantly reduce opportunities for U.S. industry to sell new or used equipment to the proposed recipient. Pursuant to Executive Order 12163 and related delegations, the Director of DSCA makes determinations regarding the impact of proposed transfers on U.S. industry.

C-130H delivered to Romania through the EDA program in 2026

DSCA maintains a public Excess Defense Articles database that provides information on certain past and planned transfers. A 1993 report by the Government Accountability Office found that, in the early 1990s, the governments of Israel, Egypt, Turkey, Greece, Portugal, Morocco, Oman, and several NATO allies benefited from EDA transfers. In 2021, Poland acquired five surplus C-130H transport aircraft from the 309th Aerospace Maintenance and Regeneration Group’s aircraft "boneyard" under the EDA program. Analysts have suggested that the EDA authority could also be used to transfer certain munitions, such as cluster artillery shells, to Ukraine during periods when new appropriations are delayed, though such proposals are politically and legally contested.

== Amendments to 1961 Act ==
The Foreign Assistance Act of 1961 (FAA) is the primary U.S. legislation governing foreign aid, consolidating pre-existing programs into a unified framework for economic, military, and humanitarian assistance. Enacted during the Cold War, it initially prioritized countering Soviet influence but has since evolved to address global development, health crises, democratic governance, and other objectives. The Act has been amended many times to change authorization levels, add new authorities, and introduce additional restrictions and reporting requirements. Selected amendments include:

Date of enactment	Public law number	U.S. statute citation	U.S. legislative bill	U.S. presidential administration
August 1, 1962	Pub. L. 87–565	76 Stat. 255	S. 2996	John F. Kennedy
December 16, 1963	Pub. L. 88–205	77 Stat. 379	H.R. 7885	Lyndon B. Johnson
October 7, 1964	Pub. L. 88–633	78 Stat. 1009	H.R. 11380	Lyndon B. Johnson
September 6, 1965	Pub. L. 89–171	79 Stat. 653	H.R. 7750	Lyndon B. Johnson
March 18, 1966	Pub. L. 89–371	80 Stat. 74	H.R. 12169	Lyndon B. Johnson
September 19, 1966	Pub. L. 89–583	80 Stat. 795-3	H.R. 15750	Lyndon B. Johnson
November 14, 1967	Pub. L. 90–137	81 Stat. 445	S. 1872	Lyndon B. Johnson
October 8, 1968	Pub. L. 90–554	82 Stat. 960	H.R. 15263	Lyndon B. Johnson
January 5, 1971	Pub. L. 91–652	84 Stat. 1942	H.R. 19911	Richard M. Nixon
December 30, 1974	Pub. L. 93–559	88 Stat. 1795	S. 3394	Gerald R. Ford
June 30, 1976	Pub. L. 94–329	90 Stat. 729	H.R. 13680	Gerald R. Ford
September 8, 2017	Pub. L. 115–56 (text) (PDF)	131 Stat. 1129	H.R. 601	Donald Trump

== See also ==
- Alliance for Progress
- Arms Export Control Act
- Foreign Military Sales Act of 1968
- Iran–Contra
- Office of Public Safety (OPS)
- Foreign policy of the United States
- War on drugs
- War on terror
