= Livestock Mandatory Reporting Act of 1999 =

The Livestock Mandatory Reporting Act of 1999 (Title IX of the FY2000 USDA appropriations act (P.L. 106-78)) requires large packers and importers to report to USDA the details of all transactions involving purchases of livestock and imported boxed lamb cuts, and the details of all transactions involving domestic and export sales of boxed beef cuts, sales of domestic and imported boxed lamb cuts, and sales of lamb carcasses. Additional provisions impose, in turn, new data reporting requirements on USDA, including more frequent price reports along with new monthly information on retail prices for meat and poultry products.

In the past, meat packers and processors were not required to report the prices they paid for the animals or the terms of sale. Rather, daily sales and price information was collected by the Agricultural Marketing Service from companies on a voluntary basis. AMS reporters also attended auctions to collect price information.

However, as more and more animals were sold under formula pricing, other contract, or captive supply arrangements, the open cash markets became less helpful as benchmarks. On the argument that such arrangements also enabled packers to more easily conceal potential anti-competitive practices, Congress passed the Act, requiring large packers and importers to report prices and other transaction details to the Agricultural Marketing Service.

Policy issues include the ability of USDA to effectively implement the mandatory program, which had a 5-year authorization that expired October 22, 2004, and whether mandatory reporting is more or less helpful to producers than the longstanding voluntary reporting system.
