= Assistance for Orphans and Other Vulnerable Children in Developing Countries Act of 2005 =

2005 U.S. law on foreign aid for vulnerable children

- Long title: An Act to amend the Foreign Assistance Act of 1961 to provide assistance for orphans and other vulnerable children in developing countries, and for other purposes.
- Enacted by: the 109th United States Congress
- Effective: November 8, 2005

Citations
- Public law: 109–95

Codification
- Acts amended: Foreign Assistance Act of 1961
- Titles amended: 22 U.S.C.: Foreign Relations and Intercourse

Legislative history
- Introduced in the House as H.R. 1409 by; Barbara Lee (D–CA) on March 17, 2005; Committee consideration by House International Relations, Senate Foreign Relations; Passed the House on October 18, 2005 (415–9); Passed the Senate on October 24, 2005 (Passed by unanimous consent); Signed into law by President George W. Bush on November 8, 2005

The Assistance for Orphans and Other Vulnerable Children in Developing Countries Act of 2005 is a United States federal law that amended the Foreign Assistance Act of 1961 to authorize and coordinate foreign assistance programs for orphans and other vulnerable children in developing countries. The act was passed by the 109th United States Congress and signed into law by President George W. Bush on November 8, 2005, becoming Public Law 109–95.

The act sets out congressional findings on the global situation of children who have lost one or both parents or are otherwise at risk, declares it to be United States policy to support such children with basic care and services, and directs the President to implement assistance programs in cooperation with foreign governments and non-governmental organizations. Among other provisions, it calls for a comprehensive United States Government strategy, establishes a monitoring and evaluation system, mandates annual reporting to Congress, and provides for a Special Advisor for Assistance to Orphans and Vulnerable Children.

The law has been described as providing a framework for a "comprehensive, coordinated, and effective" whole-of-government response by the United States to the needs of vulnerable children abroad and as one of the legal foundations for the 2012 "U.S. Government Action Plan on Children in Adversity".

== Background ==
In the late 1990s and early 2000s, international organizations and donor governments drew attention to the growing number of children who had lost one or both parents or were otherwise at risk because of HIV/AIDS, armed conflict, poverty, and other factors. Congressional findings incorporated into Public Law 109–95 cite estimates of more than 100 million children worldwide who had lost one or both parents, with particularly high concentrations in sub-Saharan Africa and parts of Asia, and emphasize the long-term social and economic consequences of failing to meet their basic needs.

Earlier United States legislation, notably the United States Leadership Against HIV/AIDS, Tuberculosis, and Malaria Act of 2003, authorized the President's Emergency Plan for AIDS Relief (PEPFAR) and required that at least 10 percent of PEPFAR funds be spent on programs for orphans and vulnerable children affected by HIV/AIDS. Analysts and advocates argued that broader and better coordinated action was needed to address the wider population of vulnerable children beyond those directly affected by HIV/AIDS, leading to the introduction of H.R. 1409 in the 109th Congress.

== Legislative history ==
Representative Barbara Lee, a Democrat from California, introduced H.R. 1409, the Assistance for Orphans and Other Vulnerable Children in Developing Countries Act of 2005, in the United States House of Representatives on March 17, 2005. The bill was referred to the House Committee on International Relations and subsequently reported to the full House.

On October 18, 2005, the House passed H.R. 1409 by a recorded vote of 415–9. The United States Senate considered the measure under unanimous consent procedures and passed it without amendment on October 24, 2005. President George W. Bush signed the bill into law on November 8, 2005, designating it Public Law 109–95.

== Provisions ==
=== Findings and policy ===
Section 2 of Public Law 109–95 sets out congressional findings describing the scale and causes of the global orphan and vulnerable-children crisis, citing the impacts of HIV/AIDS, armed conflict, natural disasters, and extreme poverty on children's well-being. The act states that it is United States policy to support a comprehensive, coordinated, and effective response to the needs of orphans and other vulnerable children in developing countries, working in partnership with foreign governments, international organizations, faith-based groups, and non-governmental organizations.

=== Assistance programs ===
Section 3 of the act amends part I of the Foreign Assistance Act of 1961 by adding a new section 135. Under this provision, the President is authorized to furnish assistance, on such terms as the President may determine, to provide basic care and services for orphans and other vulnerable children in developing countries. Eligible activities include strengthening family- and community-based care, improving access to food, shelter, education, and health care, reducing barriers such as school fees, preventing exploitation and abuse, supporting inheritance and property rights, and providing psychosocial support for children affected by HIV/AIDS and other crises.

In assisting, the act encourages collaboration with host-country governments, community-based organizations, and international partners in order to build sustainable systems of care for children and families.

=== Strategy, monitoring, and reporting ===
Public Law 109–95 directs the President to develop and submit to Congress a long-term, comprehensive United States Government strategy for meeting the needs of orphans and other vulnerable children in developing countries. The strategy is to include specific objectives, criteria for targeting resources, plans for coordination with foreign governments and multilateral institutions, and mechanisms for integrating child-focused concerns across relevant United States Government programs.

The act calls for establishing a monitoring and evaluation system to assess the effectiveness of United States assistance to orphans and vulnerable children. The President is instructed to develop performance goals and indicators and to improve the collection and analysis of data on programs and beneficiaries. A separate provision requires an annual report to Congress describing assistance provided under the act, the agencies and offices involved, the amounts of funding obligated, and the numbers of children and families reached.

=== Special Advisor and interagency coordination ===
Section 3 of Public Law 109–95 added a provision for a Special Advisor for Assistance to Orphans and Vulnerable Children, originally appointed by the USAID Administrator in consultation with the Secretary of State. The appointment provision was amended in 2021 to require the Secretary of State, in consultation with the USAID Administrator, to appoint the Special Advisor; the Secretary may delegate that authority to the USAID Administrator. The Special Advisor is tasked with promoting coordinated planning and implementation of programs across relevant departments and agencies, supporting the development of the strategy and annual reports, and serving as a focal point for engagement with external partners.

To improve collaboration, the act encourages the establishment of an interagency working group including USAID, the Department of State, the Department of Labor, the Department of Health and Human Services, and other departments and agencies involved in child-focused assistance.

== Implementation and impact ==
Following its enactment, a United States Government Interagency Working Group on Orphans and Other Vulnerable Children was established to coordinate implementation of the act and to prepare annual reports to Congress. Early reports highlighted challenges in tracking spending, measuring outcomes, and harmonizing efforts across agencies, but concluded that the law had raised the profile of vulnerable children within United States foreign assistance policy and encouraged more systematic planning and data collection.

A 2017 analysis in National Academy of Medicine Perspectives characterized the law as promoting a comprehensive, whole-of-government approach to children in adversity and noted that it called for an interagency strategy, a government-wide monitoring and evaluation system, and a special advisor based at USAID. In 2012 the United States Government released the Action Plan on Children in Adversity, 2012–2017, which explicitly cites Public Law 109–95 and sets out three overarching objectives: strengthening early childhood development, putting family care first, and protecting children from violence, exploitation, abuse, and neglect. The action plan has been described as the first whole-of-government strategic guidance for United States international assistance programs focused on children.

In 2024, the United States Government issued a successor strategy, Advancing Protection and Care for Children in Adversity: A U.S. Government Strategy for Children to Thrive, 2024–2029. The whole-of-government strategy identified three objectives: building strong beginnings for children, helping families to thrive, and preventing violence against children.

The act complements other United States initiatives, including PEPFAR's requirement that at least ten percent of program funds be devoted to orphans and vulnerable children affected by HIV/AIDS, and it is cited in debates on how to structure cross-sectoral investments in early childhood development in low- and middle-income countries.

== Proposed reauthorization ==
In December 2025, Representative Joaquin Castro introduced the bipartisan Global Child Thrive Reauthorization Act of 2025, H.R. 6347. The bill would require the Secretary of State to appoint the Special Advisor within 90 days of enactment, extend the requirement to issue implementing directives, and extend the authorization of the Global Child Thrive Act of 2020 through 2030. The House Committee on Foreign Affairs voted 43–6 to order the bill reported on December 3, 2025. In a March 2026 cost estimate, the Congressional Budget Office stated that the Special Advisor position was vacant.

== See also ==
- Foreign Assistance Act of 1961
- United States Agency for International Development
- United States foreign aid
- President's Emergency Plan for AIDS Relief
- United States Leadership Against HIV/AIDS, Tuberculosis, and Malaria Act of 2003
