= Office of Regional Security and Arms Transfers =

Office of the U.S. Department of State responsible for arms transfers

- Seal of the United States Department of State

Office overview
- Type: Office of the U.S. Department of State
- Jurisdiction: United States Department of State
- Headquarters: Harry S Truman Building, Washington, D.C., U.S.
- Parent department: United States Department of State
- Parent Office: Bureau of Political-Military Affairs
- Key documents: Arms Export Control Act; Foreign Assistance Act of 1961
- Website: www.state.gov/bureaus-offices/under-secretary-for-arms-control-and-international-security-affairs/bureau-of-political-military-affairs/office-of-regional-security-and-arms-transfers

The Office of Regional Security and Arms Transfers (RSAT) is an office of the United States Department of State's Bureau of Political-Military Affairs (PM) that manages the department's review of most government-to-government transfers of U.S.-origin defense articles and services to foreign governments. It is responsible for ensuring that proposed Foreign Military Sales (FMS), grant assistance, and related arms transfers are consistent with U.S. foreign policy and national security objectives, and for coordinating those transfers with the United States Department of Defense and U.S. embassies. RSAT's portfolio includes major arms transfers to allies and partners in Europe, the Middle East and the Indo-Pacific, and expanded significantly in the 2020s in connection with large-scale U.S. security assistance to Ukraine.

== Organization and mandate ==
RSAT is one of the offices that make up the Bureau of Political-Military Affairs, which links the Department of State and the Department of Defense on international security, security assistance and defense trade issues. According to State Department materials, the office "advances U.S. national security by building the capacity of key partners and allies, strengthening regional security architectures, and enhancing the interoperability of U.S. and allied forces" through its work on arms transfers and security assistance.

The office is headed by a director in the Senior Executive Service who reports to the Deputy Assistant Secretary of State for Regional Security and Security Assistance and, through that official, to the Assistant Secretary of State for Political-Military Affairs. Public biographical information for former directors describes RSAT as overseeing worldwide foreign military sales, transfers of excess defense articles and third-party transfer requests on behalf of the State Department.

== Functions ==
=== Arms transfer review and Foreign Military Sales ===
Under State Department guidance, RSAT manages the sale and export of U.S.-origin defense articles and services to foreign governments through the government-to-government Foreign Military Sales program and related grant and loan authorities, including Foreign Military Financing and Excess Defense Articles. Congressional Research Service reporting describes RSAT as the office responsible for ensuring that all FMS cases transmitted by the Defense Security Cooperation Agency (DSCA) are reviewed within the State Department for consistency with U.S. foreign policy and national security, including considerations related to human rights, regional stability and the risk of misuse or diversion.

Analyses of U.S. arms transfer policy note that RSAT plays a central role in implementing presidential guidance on conventional arms transfers and in coordinating with the Department of Defense, the National Security Council and U.S. industry on major sales. Commentary in Defense News and other outlets has highlighted RSAT's role in arms export reform efforts and in managing record levels of government-to-government arms sales in the late 2010s.

=== Third-party transfers and end-use monitoring ===
RSAT also oversees State Department approval of "third-party transfers"—requests by foreign governments to re-transfer U.S.-origin defense articles to a different government or end user—and sets conditions for demilitarization, disposal or changes of end-use for sensitive equipment. Oversight bodies have noted that RSAT's written permission is required before foreign partners may transfer, dispose of or change the use of defense articles designated for enhanced end-use monitoring under U.S. security assistance programs.

Research on U.S. end-use monitoring has highlighted RSAT's role in working with DSCA, the Department of Defense and other offices to develop policies intended to prevent diversion or misuse of U.S.-provided weapons, including proposals to update FMS procedures for emerging technologies such as directed-energy weapons.

== Role in assistance to Ukraine ==
During the 2022 Russian invasion of Ukraine, RSAT became one of the principal State Department offices responsible for clearing large volumes of U.S. security assistance and arms transfers to the Ukrainian government. In 2023, Defense One reported that RSAT's caseload related to weapons drawn from U.S. stockpiles for Ukraine had increased by roughly 15,000 percent compared with pre-war levels, according to testimony by Assistant Secretary of State for Political-Military Affairs Jessica Lewis.

The office's director has publicly discussed RSAT's role in assessing requests for advanced capabilities such as long-range fires and fighter aircraft for Ukraine, noting that officials must balance Ukrainian requirements with escalation risks, training timelines and allied contributions. Subsequent analyses by the Government Accountability Office and other oversight bodies have examined RSAT's coordination with the Department of Defense on tracking and monitoring U.S.-origin equipment in Ukraine and on managing transfers of damaged or destroyed systems.

== Oversight and assessments ==
Academic literature and policy analysis have treated RSAT as a significant node in the U.S. arms transfer decision-making process, linking strategic, economic and human-rights considerations. A 2019 analysis in Strategic Studies Quarterly described RSAT and related offices as central to how the United States uses conventional arms transfers to advance both security and economic objectives.

Several oversight reports have identified challenges in RSAT's ability to monitor compliance with arms transfer agreements. A 2025 Government Accountability Office review concluded that the office relied heavily on DSCA and U.S. embassy security cooperation personnel to identify potential violations of transfer conditions and recommended clearer guidance on what incidents should be reported and how quickly. A Department of Defense Inspector General evaluation the same year recommended that RSAT and the Department of Defense clarify responsibilities for approving demilitarization or disposal of sensitive equipment requiring enhanced end-use monitoring. Independent research organizations have similarly called for stronger coordination between RSAT and defense agencies to expand end-use monitoring and reduce the risk of civilian harm associated with U.S.-supplied weapons.

== See also ==
- Bureau of Political-Military Affairs
- Defense Security Cooperation Agency
- Foreign Military Sales
- Directorate of Defense Trade Controls
- Arms Export Control Act
- Foreign Military Financing
