= Iran Nonproliferation Act of 2000 =

Act of the US Congress

- Long title: An Act to provide for the application of measures to foreign persons who transfer to Iran certain goods, services, or technology, and for other purposes.
- Acronyms (colloquial): INA
- Nicknames: Iran Nonproliferation Act of 1999
- Enacted by: the 106th United States Congress
- Effective: March 14, 2000

Citations
- Public law: 106-178
- Statutes at Large: 114 Stat. 38

Codification
- Titles amended: 50 U.S.C.: War and National Defense
- U.S.C. sections amended: 50 U.S.C. ch. 35 § 1701

Legislative history
- Introduced in the House as H.R. 1883 by Benjamin Gilman (R–NY) on May 20, 1999; Committee consideration by House International Relations, House Science; Passed the House on September 14, 1999 (419-0, Roll call vote 409, via Clerk.House.gov); Passed the Senate on February 24, 2000 (98-0, Roll call vote 12, via Senate.gov, in lieu of S.Amdt. 2820) with amendment; House agreed to Senate amendment on March 1, 2000 (420-0, Roll call vote 028, via Clerk.House.gov); Signed into law by President Bill Clinton on March 14, 2000

The Iran Nonproliferation Act of 2000 is a United States Act of Congress signed into law by President Bill Clinton on March 14, 2000. The act authorizes the President of the United States to take punitive action against individuals or organizations known to be providing material aid to weapons of mass destruction programs in Iran.

== Amendment to 2000 Act ==
U.S. Congressional amendment to the Iran Nonproliferation Act of 2000.

Date of Enactment	Public Law Number	U.S. Statute Citation	U.S. Legislative Bill	U.S. Presidential Administration
November 22, 2005	P.L. 109–112	119 Stat. 2366	S. 1713	George W. Bush

== See also ==
- Chemical Weapons Convention
- International Emergency Economic Powers Act
- Missile Technology Control Regime
- Nuclear Non-Proliferation Act of 1978
- Nuclear Suppliers Group
- Wassenaar Arrangement
