= Global AIDS and Tuberculosis Relief Act of 2000 =

US law

- Other short titles: World Bank AIDS Marshall Plan Trust Fund Act; World Bank AIDS Prevention Trust Fund Act; International Tuberculosis Control Act of 2000
- Long title: An Act to provide for negotiations for the creation of a trust fund to be administered by the International Bank for Reconstruction and Development of the International Development Association to combat the AIDS epidemic.
- Acronyms (colloquial): GATRA
- Nicknames: Global AIDS Research and Relief Act of 2000
- Enacted by: the 106th United States Congress
- Effective: August 19, 2000

Citations
- Public law: 106-264
- Statutes at Large: 114 Stat. 748

Codification
- Titles amended: 22 U.S.C.: Foreign Relations and Intercourse
- U.S.C. sections created: 22 U.S.C. § 6801 et seq.
- U.S.C. sections amended: 22 U.S.C. § 2151b; 22 U.S.C. § 2222; 22 U.S.C. § 2293; 22 U.S.C. § 2367; 22 U.S.C. § 2395

Legislative history
- Introduced in the House as H.R. 3519 by James A. Leach (R–IA) on January 24, 2000; Committee consideration by House Banking and Financial Services, Senate Foreign Relations; Passed the House on May 15, 2000 (Passed voice vote); Passed the Senate on July 26, 2000 (Passed unanimous consent) with amendment; House agreed to Senate amendment on July 27, 2000 (Agreed without objection); Signed into law by President Bill Clinton on August 19, 2000

Global AIDS and Tuberculosis Relief Act of 2000 or Global AIDS Research and Relief Act of 2000 is a United States federal law establishing the World Bank AIDS Trust Fund for the care and prevention of HIV/AIDS and tuberculosis in overseas continents supporting substantial populations. The Act of Congress endorsed the International Bank for Reconstruction and Development and International Development Association to govern the financial fund for the global opportunistic infection epidemics.

The H.R. 3519 legislation was passed by the 106th United States Congressional session and confirmed as a federal law by the 42nd President of the United States Bill Clinton on August 19, 2000.

== Titles of the Act ==
Title 22 Chapter 76 codified law and Chapter 32 section amendments were drafted as three titled sections providing authorities for international assistance confronting the transmissible diseases HIV/AIDS and tuberculosis.

=== Title I – Assistance To Countries With Large Populations Having HIV/AIDS ===
22 U.S.C. § 6801 ~ Definitions
22 U.S.C. § 6802 ~ U.S. Congressional findings and purposes

==== Subchapter I – United States Assistance ====
22 U.S.C. § 6811 ~ Coordinated donor strategy for support and education of AIDS orphans in Sub-Saharan Africa
22 U.S.C. § 6812 ~ African crisis response initiative and HIV/AIDS training

==== Subchapter II – World Bank AIDS Trust Fund ====
Part A – Establishment of the Fund
22 U.S.C. § 6821 ~ Establishment
22 U.S.C. § 6822 ~ Grant authorities
22 U.S.C. § 6823 ~ Administration
22 U.S.C. § 6824 ~ Advisory Board

Part B – Reports
22 U.S.C. § 6831 ~ Reports to Congress

Part C – United States Financial Participation
22 U.S.C. § 6841 ~ Authorization of appropriations
22 U.S.C. § 6842 ~ Certification requirement

=== Title II – International Tuberculosis Control ===
22 U.S.C. § 2151b ~ U.S. Congressional findings
22 U.S.C. § 2151b(c) ~ Assistance For Tuberculosis Prevention, Treatment, Control, and Elimination

=== Title III – Administrative Authorities ===
22 U.S.C. § 2367 ~ Termination Expenses
22 U.S.C. § 2395l ~ Effective Program Oversight

== See also ==
Global Alliance for Vaccines and Immunizations
International AIDS Vaccine Initiative
Joint United Nations Programme on HIV/AIDS
President's Emergency Plan for AIDS Relief
The Global Fund to Fight AIDS, Tuberculosis and Malaria
United States Agency for International Development
