= Federal Disaster Assistance Nonprofit Fairness Act of 2013 =

- Long title: To amend the Robert T. Stafford Disaster Relief and Emergency Assistance Act to clarify that houses of worship are eligible for certain disaster relief and emergency assistance on terms equal to other eligible private nonprofit facilities, and for other purposes.
- Announced in: the 113th United States Congress
- Sponsored by: Rep. Christopher H. Smith (R, NJ-4)
- Number of co-sponsors: 2

Codification
- Acts affected: Internal Revenue Code of 1986, Robert T. Stafford Disaster Relief and Emergency Assistance Act
- U.S.C. sections affected: 42 U.S.C. § 5121(etseq), 42 U.S.C. § 5122(10)(B), 42 U.S.C. § 5172(a)(3),
- Agencies affected: United States Congress, Supreme Court of the United States, Federal Emergency Management Agency,

Legislative history
- Introduced in the House as H.R. 592 by Chris Smith (R–NJ) on February 8, 2013; Committee consideration by United States House Committee on Transportation and Infrastructure, United States House Transportation Subcommittee on Economic Development, Public Buildings and Emergency Management, United States Senate Committee on Homeland Security and Governmental Affairs; Passed the House on February 13, 2013 (354-72)

The Federal Disaster Assistance Nonprofit Fairness Act of 2013 (H.R. 592) is a bill that passed in the United States House of Representatives during the 113th United States Congress. The bill would make religious organizations and religious non-profits eligible to receive federal funding for repairs and rebuilding of their facilities after a major disaster. The bill amends the Robert T. Stafford Disaster Relief and Emergency Assistance Act.

The bill passed the House by a large margin, but was criticized by opponents for using taxpayer money to help tax-exempt organizations and for violating the principle of separation of church and state.

== Provisions/Elements of the bill ==
This summary is based largely on the summary provided by the Congressional Research Service, a public domain source.

The Bill would amend the Robert T. Stafford Disaster Relief and Emergency Assistance Act to include community centers, including tax-exempt houses of worship, as "private nonprofit facilities" for purposes of disaster relief and emergency assistance eligibility under such Act.

The amendment makes a church, synagogue, mosque, temple, or other house of worship, and a private nonprofit facility operated by a religious organization, eligible for federal contributions for the repair, restoration, and replacement of facilities damaged or destroyed by a major disaster, without regard to the religious character of the facility or the primary religious use of the facility.

Finally, the bill makes the Act applicable to the provision of assistance in response to a major disaster or emergency declared on or after October 28, 2012.

== Procedural history ==
=== House ===
The Bill was introduced in the House of Representatives on February 8, 2013 by Rep. Chris Smith (R-NJ). The bill was immediately referred to the United States House Committee on Transportation and Infrastructure. It was then referred to the United States House Transportation Subcommittee on Economic Development, Public Buildings and Emergency Management on February 11, 2013. On February 13, the Bill was considered on the House floor under a suspension of the rules; it passed later that day 354-72 (Roll Call Vote 39). By the time it had passed, the Bill had received 9 cosponsors in the House. Of the 72 members who voted against the bill, 66 were Democrats and 6 were Republicans.

=== Senate ===
The Bill was received in the Senate on February 14, 2013. It was referred to the United States Senate Committee on Homeland Security and Governmental Affairs on March 13, 2013.

== Debate ==
Supporters of the Bill argued that the bill was necessary to clarify existing law by correcting an oversight. The House Republican Majority's official website stated their view that "unlike previous disasters, Congress did not clarify that religious nonprofits, including houses of worship, are eligible to receive disaster funding when providing aid for victims and communities impacted by Hurricane Sandy. As a result, the (Obama) Administration is interpreting current law to preclude houses of worship from being eligible for funding on the same terms as similarly impacted nonprofits." Other supporters of federal funding for houses of worship damaged in disasters have argued that such places a key parts of communities and are not exempted from other aspects of government disaster management, like evacuation orders or emergency fortification attempts, and therefore should not be prevented from seeking disaster relief.

Opponents of the Bill argued that the Obama Administration is right to deny funds to religious institutions; this argument was often made on First Amendment grounds. The non-profit Center for Inquiry wrote on its website that they opposed the Bill because they believed it violated the First Amendment's prohibition against government establishing any religion. The Center for Inquiry argued that "true religious freedom protects the conscience of the taxpayer by ensuring that his or her money is not used to support or advance religion with which he or she may disagree." One blogger referred to the act as the "Taxpayer Money to Tax-Exempt Churches Act". The group Americans United for Separation of Church and State also argued against the Bill, writing on their website that "Church-state separation protects the right of taxpayers to support only the religious institutions of their choice, and it ensures the independence and integrity of faith communities. Houses of worship exist primarily to teach the tenets of their religion. They should be supported by donations, not government subsidies."

== See also ==
- Emergency management
- Stafford Disaster Relief and Emergency Assistance Act
- Separation of church and state in the United States
- 501(c) organization
