= 106th United States Congress =

1999–2001 U.S. legislative term

←	105th	107th	→
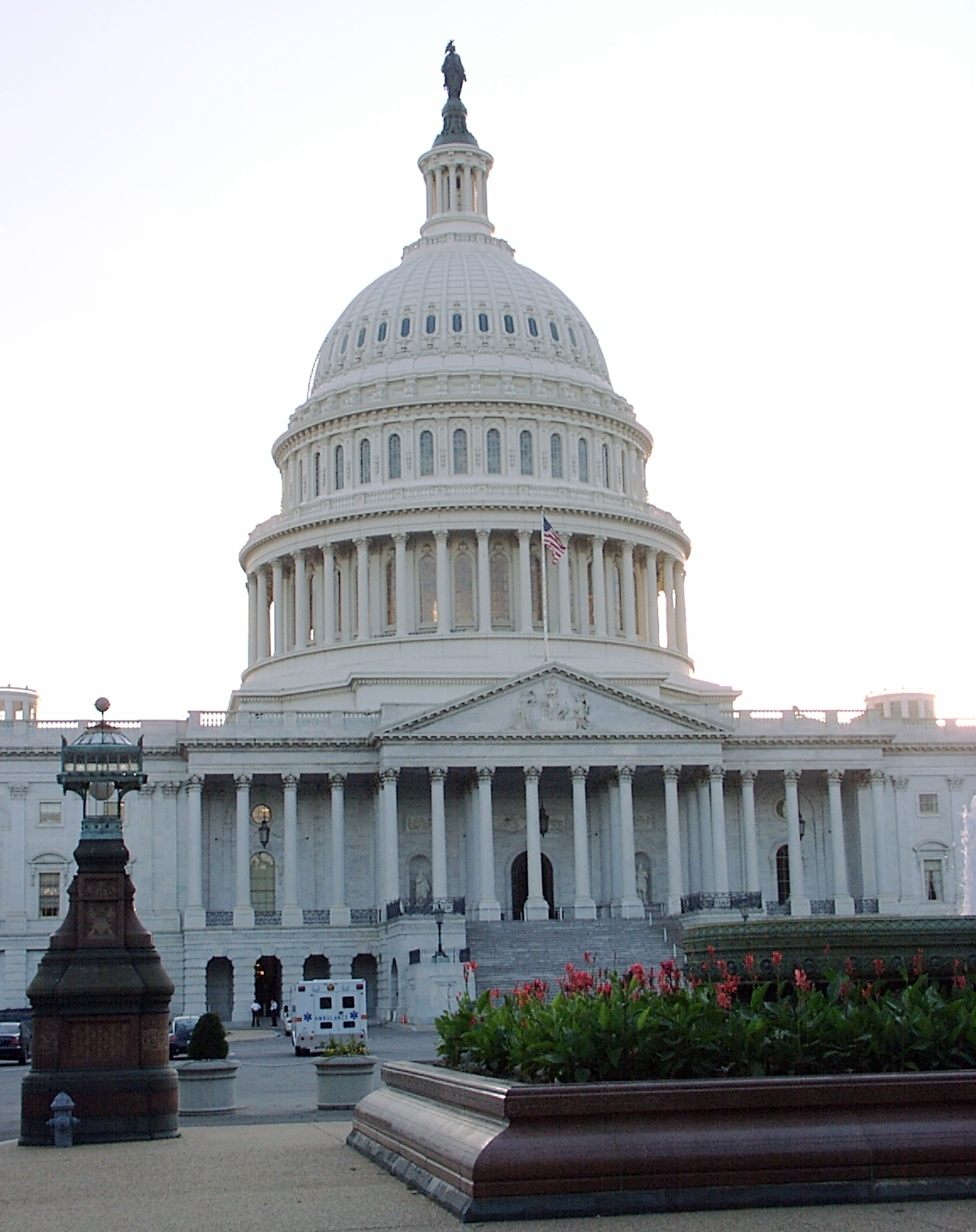
- United States Capitol (2000)

Overview
- Legislative body: United States Congress
- Jurisdiction: United States
- Term: January 3, 1999 – January 3, 2001

Senate
- Members: 100
- President: Al Gore (D)
- President pro tempore: Strom Thurmond (R)
- Party control: Republican

House of Representatives
- Members: 435 representatives 5 non-voting delegates
- Speaker: Dennis Hastert (R)
- Party control: Republican

Sessions
- 1st: January 6, 1999 – November 22, 1999
- 2nd: January 24, 2000 – December 15, 2000

The 106th United States Congress was a meeting of the legislative branch of the United States federal government, composed of the United States Senate and the United States House of Representatives. It met in Washington, D.C., from January 3, 1999, to January 3, 2001, during the last two years of Bill Clinton's presidency. The apportionment of seats in the House of Representatives was based on the 1990 United States census. Both chambers maintained a Republican majority.

This is the most recent Congress with Republican senators from the states of Delaware (William Roth), Michigan (Spencer Abraham) and Washington (Slade Gorton), all of whom lost re-election in 2000. It was the first Congress where Baby boomers comprised the majority of the House of Representatives.

== Major events ==
- January 7, 1999 – February 12, 1999: Impeachment trial of Bill Clinton
- March 24, 1999 – June 10, 1999: NATO bombing of Yugoslavia
- March 29, 1999: Dow Jones Industrial Average ended above 10,000 for the first time.
- April 20, 1999: Columbine High School massacre
- April 3, 2000: United States v. Microsoft: Federal court held Microsoft liable for anti-trust violations
- November 7, 2000: Presidential election, Senate election, House election
- November 7, 2000 – December 13, 2000: Presidential election, Florida recount, and Bush v. Gore litigation

== Major legislation ==
- May 21, 1999: Emergency Supplemental Appropriations Act, Pub. L. 106–31 (text) (PDF) (Kosovo operations)
- August 17, 1999: Water Resources Development Act of 1999, Pub. L. 106–53 (text) (PDF)
- October 26, 1999: Wireless Communications and Public Safety Act of 1999, Pub.L. 106-81
- November 12, 1999: Gramm-Leach-Bliley Financial Services Modernization Act, Pub. L. 106–102 (text) (PDF)
- November 29, 1999: American Inventors Protection Act, Pub. L. 106–113 (text) (PDF) (including Anticybersquatting Consumer Protection Act)
- December 9, 1999: Digital Theft Deterrence and Copyright Damages Improvement Act of 1999, Pub.L. 106-160
- December 14, 1999: Foster Care Independence Act, Pub. L. 106–169 (text) (PDF)
- March 14, 2000: Iran Nonproliferation Act of 2000, Pub. L. 106–178 (text) (PDF)
- April 5, 2000: Wendell H. Ford Aviation Investment and Reform Act for the 21st Century, Pub. L. 106–181 (text) (PDF)
- May 18, 2000: African Growth and Opportunity Act, Pub. L. 106–200 (text) (PDF)
- May 26, 2000: Hmong Veterans' Naturalization Act of 2000, Pub.L. 106-207
- May 26, 2000: Muhammad Ali Boxing Reform Act, Pub.L. 106-210
- June 22, 2000: Agricultural Risk Protection Act of 2000, Pub.L. 106-224
- June 30, 2000: Electronic Signatures in Global and National Commerce Act, Pub. L. 106–229 (text) (PDF)
- August 7, 2000: Oceans Act, Pub. L. 106–256 (text) (PDF)
- August 19, 2000: Global AIDS and Tuberculosis Relief Act of 2000, Pub.L. 106-264
- September 22, 2000: Religious Land Use and Institutionalized Persons Act, Pub. L. 106–274 (text) (PDF)
- October 10, 2000: U.S.-China Relations Act of 2000, Pub.L. 106-286
- October 17, 2000: Children's Health Act, Pub. L. 106–310 (text) (PDF)
- October 28, 2000: Victims of Trafficking and Violence Protection Act of 2000, Pub. L. 106–386 (text) (PDF)
- October 30, 2000: Robert T. Stafford Disaster Relief and Emergency Assistance Act, Pub. L. 106–390 (text) (PDF)
- October 30, 2000: Secure Rural Schools and Community Self-Determination Act of 2000, Pub.L. 106-393
- October 30, 2000: Child Citizenship Act of 2000, Pub. L. 106–395 (text) (PDF)
- November 1, 2000: Transportation Recall Enhancement, Accountability, and Documentation (TREAD) Act, Pub.L. 106-414
- November 22, 2000: Military Extraterritorial Jurisdiction Act of 2000, Pub.L. 106-523
- December 11, 2000: Water Resources Development Act of 2000, Pub. L. 106–541 (text) (PDF)
- December 19, 2000: DNA Analysis Backlog Elimination Act of 2000, Pub.L. 106-546
- December 21, 2000: Legal Immigration Family Equity Act, Pub. L. 106–553 (text) (PDF)
- December 21, 2000: Consolidated Appropriations Act, 2001, Pub. L. 106–554 (text) (PDF) (includes Commodity Futures Modernization Act of 2000, Children's Internet Protection Act, Community Renewal Tax Relief Act of 2000)
- December 21, 2000: Shark Finning Prohibition Act, Pub.L. 106-557

== Treaties considered ==
- October 13, 1999: Comprehensive Nuclear Test Ban Treaty: Rejected

== Party summary ==
=== Senate ===
Party standings on the opening day of the 106th Congress

Membership changed with two deaths.

Affiliation	Party (Shading indicates majority caucus)		Total	
Affiliation	Democratic	Republican	Total	Vacant
End of previous Congress	45	55	100	0
Begin	45	55	100	0
October 24, 1999 (Note: In Rhode Island, John Chafee (R) died October 24, 1999, and his son, Lincoln Chafee (R), was appointed November 2, 1999, to finish the term.)	45	54	99	1
November 2, 1999	45	55	100	0
July 18, 2000 (Note: In Georgia, Paul Coverdell (R) died July 18, 2000, and Zell Miller (D) was appointed July 25, to continue the term.)	45	54	99	1
July 25, 2000	46	54	100	0
Final voting share	46%	54%		
Beginning of the next Congress	50	50	100	0

=== House of Representatives ===
There were two resignations and three deaths.

Affiliation	Party (Shading indicates majority caucus)			Total	
Affiliation	Democratic	Independent	Republican	Total	Vacant
End of previous Congress	206	1	228	435	0
Begin	211	1	223	435	0
March 2, 1999	211	1	222	434	1
June 7, 1999	211	1	223	435	0
July 16, 1999	210	1	223	434	1
July 17, 1999	211	1	222	434	1
November 17, 1999	212	1	222	435	0
January 27, 2000	212	2	221	435	0
July 27, 2000	210	2	221	435	0
September 11, 2000	209	2	221	434	1
October 10, 2000	208	2	221	434	2
December 8, 2000	208	2	222	433	3
End	208	2	222	433	3
Final voting share	48.5%	0.3%	51.2%		
Beginning of the next Congress	211	2	221	434	1

== Leadership ==
=== Senate ===
Senate President

Al Gore (D)

Senate President pro Tempore

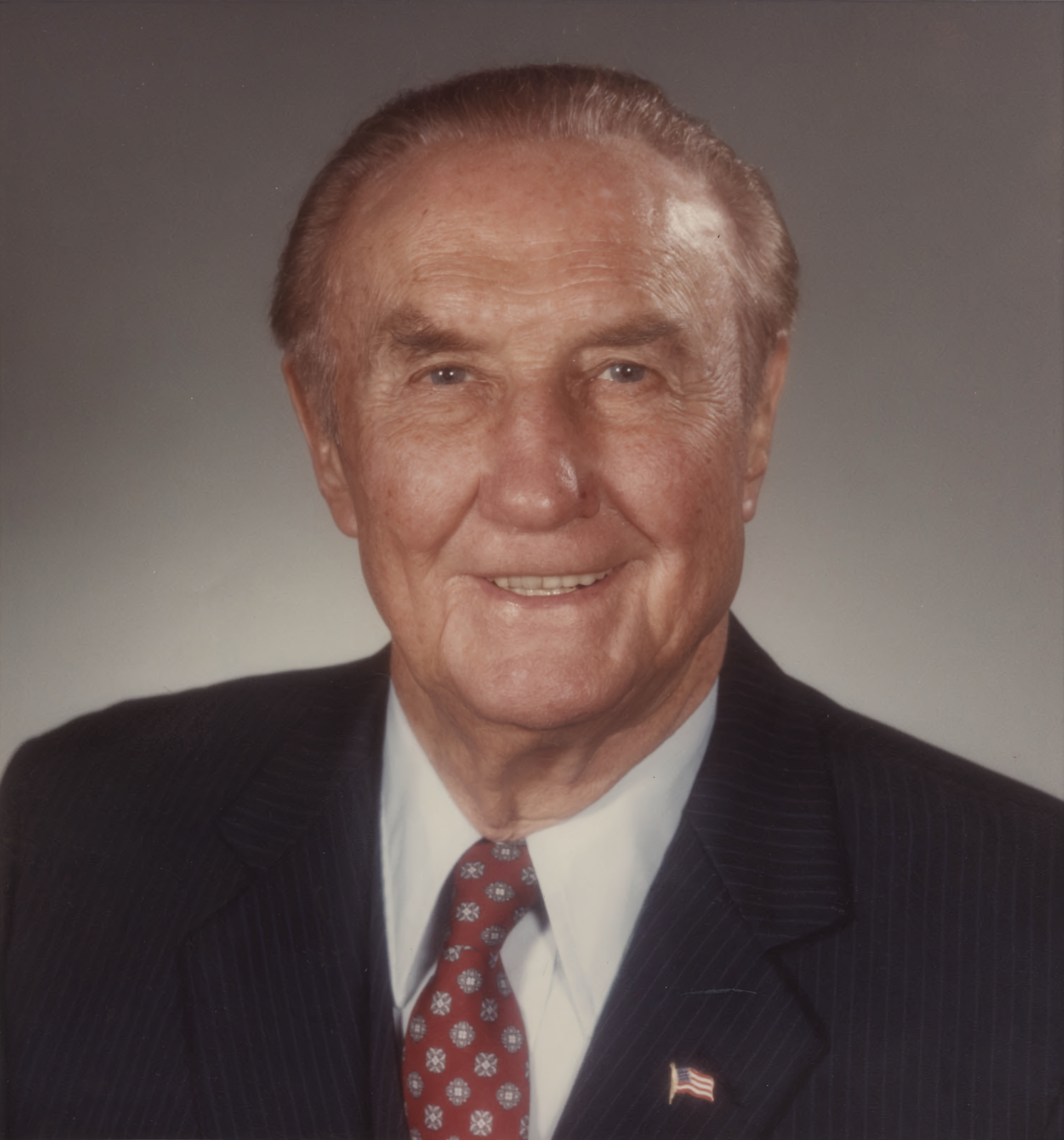
Strom Thurmond (R)

- President: Al Gore (D)
- President pro tempore: Strom Thurmond (R)

==== Majority (Republican) leadership ====
- Majority Leader: Trent Lott
- Majority Whip: Don Nickles
- Republican Conference Chairman: Connie Mack III
- Republican Conference Secretary: Paul Coverdell
- Republican Campaign Committee Chairman: Mitch McConnell
- Policy Committee Chairman: Larry Craig

==== Minority (Democratic) leadership ====
- Minority Leader: Tom Daschle
- Minority Whip: Harry Reid
- Policy Committee Chairman: Byron Dorgan
- Democratic Conference Secretary: Barbara Mikulski
- Democratic Campaign Committee Chairman: Robert Torricelli
- Chief Deputy Whip: John Breaux

=== House of Representatives ===
Speaker of the House

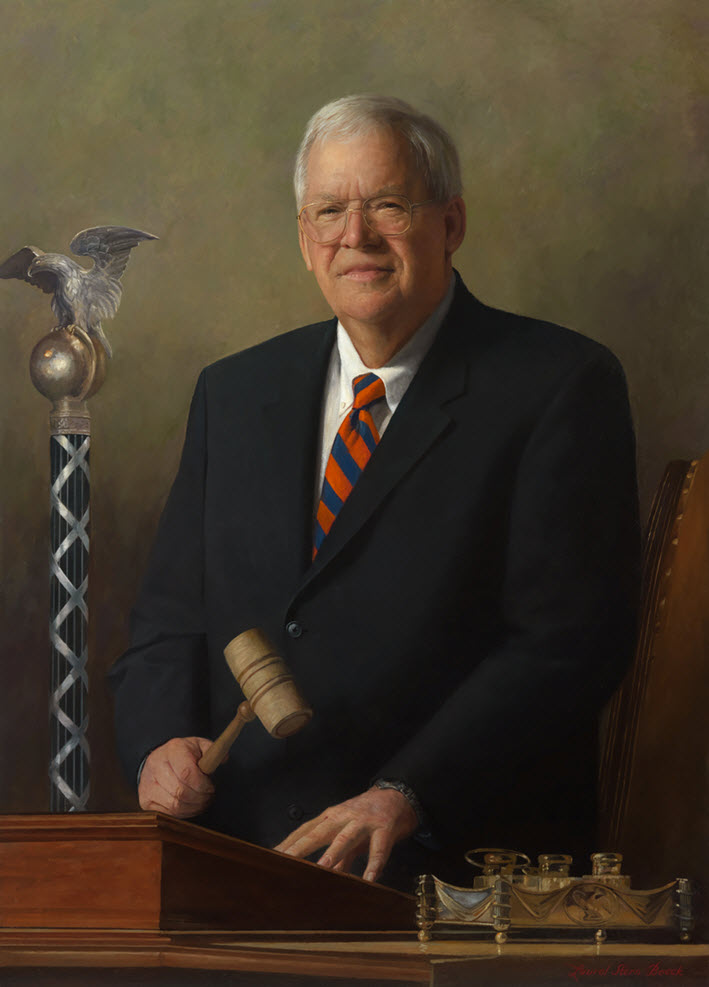
Dennis Hastert (R)

- Speaker: Dennis Hastert (R)

==== Majority (Republican) leadership ====
- Majority Leader: Dick Armey
- Majority Whip: Tom DeLay
- Chief Deputy Whip: Roy Blunt
- Republican Conference Chairman: J. C. Watts
- Republican Conference Vice-Chairman: Tillie Fowler
- Republican Conference Secretary: Deborah Pryce
- Policy Committee Chairman: Christopher Cox
- Republican Campaign Committee Chairman: Tom Davis
- House Rules Committee Chairman: David Dreier

==== Minority (Democratic) leadership ====
- Minority Leader: Dick Gephardt
- Minority Whip: David Bonior
- Chief Deputy Minority Whips: Chet Edwards, John Lewis, Ed Pastor & Maxine Waters
- Democratic Caucus Chairman: Martin Frost
- Democratic Caucus Vice Chairman: Bob Menendez
- Democratic Campaign Committee Chairman: Patrick J. Kennedy

== Members ==
Skip to House of Representatives, below

=== Senate ===
In this Congress, Class 1 meant their term ended with this Congress, facing re-election in 2000; Class 2 meant their term began in the last Congress, facing re-election in 2002; and Class 3 meant their term began in this Congress, facing re-election in 2004.

==== Alabama ====
▌2. Jeff Sessions (R)
▌3. Richard Shelby (R)

==== Alaska ====
▌2. Ted Stevens (R)
▌3. Frank Murkowski (R)

==== Arizona ====
▌1. Jon Kyl (R)
▌3. John McCain (R)

==== Arkansas ====
▌2. Tim Hutchinson (R)
▌3. Blanche Lincoln (D)

==== California ====
▌1. Dianne Feinstein (D)
▌3. Barbara Boxer (D)

==== Colorado ====
▌2. Wayne Allard (R)
▌3. Ben Nighthorse Campbell (R)

==== Connecticut ====
▌1. Joe Lieberman (D)
▌3. Chris Dodd (D)

==== Delaware ====
▌1. William Roth (R)
▌2. Joe Biden (D)

==== Florida ====
▌1. Connie Mack III (R)
▌3. Bob Graham (D)

==== Georgia ====
▌2. Max Cleland (D)
▌3. Paul Coverdell (R), until July 18, 2000

▌Zell Miller (D), from July 27, 2000

==== Hawaii ====
▌1. Daniel Akaka (D)
▌3. Daniel Inouye (D)

==== Idaho ====
▌2. Larry Craig (R)
▌3. Mike Crapo (R)

==== Illinois ====
▌2. Dick Durbin (D)
▌3. Peter Fitzgerald (R)

==== Indiana ====
▌1. Richard Lugar (R)
▌3. Evan Bayh (D)

==== Iowa ====
▌2. Tom Harkin (D)
▌3. Chuck Grassley (R)

==== Kansas ====
▌2. Pat Roberts (R)
▌3. Sam Brownback (R)

==== Kentucky ====
▌2. Mitch McConnell (R)
▌3. Jim Bunning (R)

==== Louisiana ====
▌2. Mary Landrieu (D)
▌3. John Breaux (D)

==== Maine ====
▌1. Olympia Snowe (R)
▌2. Susan Collins (R)

==== Maryland ====
▌1. Paul Sarbanes (D)
▌3. Barbara Mikulski (D)

==== Massachusetts ====
▌1. Ted Kennedy (D)
▌2. John Kerry (D)

==== Michigan ====
▌1. Spencer Abraham (R)
▌2. Carl Levin (D)

==== Minnesota ====
▌1. Rod Grams (R)
▌2. Paul Wellstone (DFL)

==== Mississippi ====
▌1. Trent Lott (R)
▌2. Thad Cochran (R)

==== Missouri ====
▌1. John Ashcroft (R)
▌3. Kit Bond (R)

==== Montana ====
▌1. Conrad Burns (R)
▌2. Max Baucus (D)

==== Nebraska ====
▌1. Bob Kerrey (D)
▌2. Chuck Hagel (R)

==== Nevada ====
▌1. Richard Bryan (D)
▌3. Harry Reid (D)

==== New Hampshire ====
▌2. Bob Smith (R)
▌3. Judd Gregg (R)

==== New Jersey ====
▌1. Frank Lautenberg (D)
▌2. Robert Torricelli (D)

==== New Mexico ====
▌1. Jeff Bingaman (D)
▌2. Pete Domenici (R)

==== New York ====
▌1. Daniel Patrick Moynihan (D)
▌3. Chuck Schumer (D)

==== North Carolina ====
▌2. Jesse Helms (R)
▌3. John Edwards (D)

==== North Dakota ====
▌1. Kent Conrad (D-NPL)
▌3. Byron Dorgan (D-NPL)

==== Ohio ====
▌1. Mike DeWine (R)
▌3. George Voinovich (R)

==== Oklahoma ====
▌2. Jim Inhofe (R)
▌3. Don Nickles (R)

==== Oregon ====
▌2. Gordon H. Smith (R)
▌3. Ron Wyden (D)

==== Pennsylvania ====
▌1. Rick Santorum (R)
▌3. Arlen Specter (R)

==== Rhode Island ====
▌1. John Chafee (R), until October 24, 1999

▌Lincoln Chafee (R), from November 2, 1999

▌2. Jack Reed (D)

==== South Carolina ====
▌2. Strom Thurmond (R)
▌3. Fritz Hollings (D)

==== South Dakota ====
▌2. Tim Johnson (D)
▌3. Tom Daschle (D)

==== Tennessee ====
▌1. Bill Frist (R)
▌2. Fred Thompson (R)

==== Texas ====
▌1. Kay Bailey Hutchison (R)
▌2. Phil Gramm (R)

==== Utah ====
▌1. Orrin Hatch (R)
▌3. Bob Bennett (R)

==== Vermont ====
▌1. Jim Jeffords (R)
▌3. Patrick Leahy (D)

==== Virginia ====
▌1. Chuck Robb (D)
▌2. John Warner (R)

==== Washington ====
▌1. Slade Gorton (R)
▌3. Patty Murray (D)

==== West Virginia ====
▌1. Robert Byrd (D)
▌2. Jay Rockefeller (D)

==== Wisconsin ====
▌1. Herb Kohl (D)
▌3. Russ Feingold (D)

==== Wyoming ====
▌1. Craig L. Thomas (R)
▌2. Mike Enzi (R)

Senate composition by state 2 Democrats 2 Republicans 1 Democrat and 1 Republican

Senate majority leadership

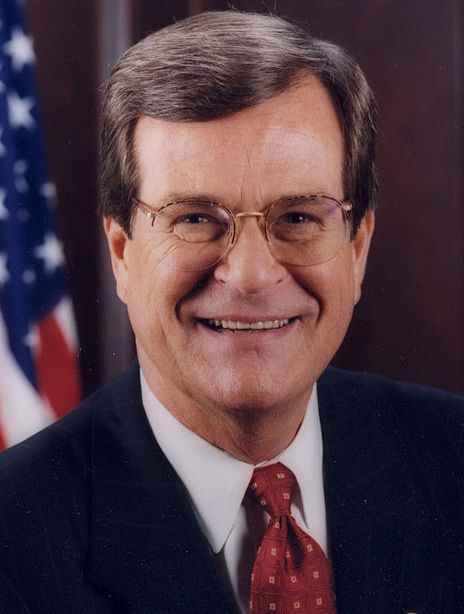
Republican leader
Trent Lott

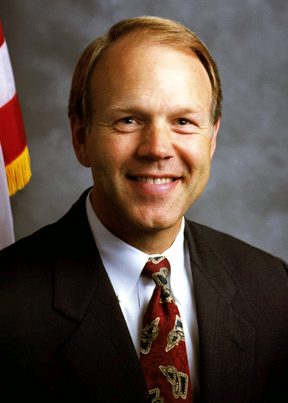
Republican whip
Don Nickles

Senate minority leadership

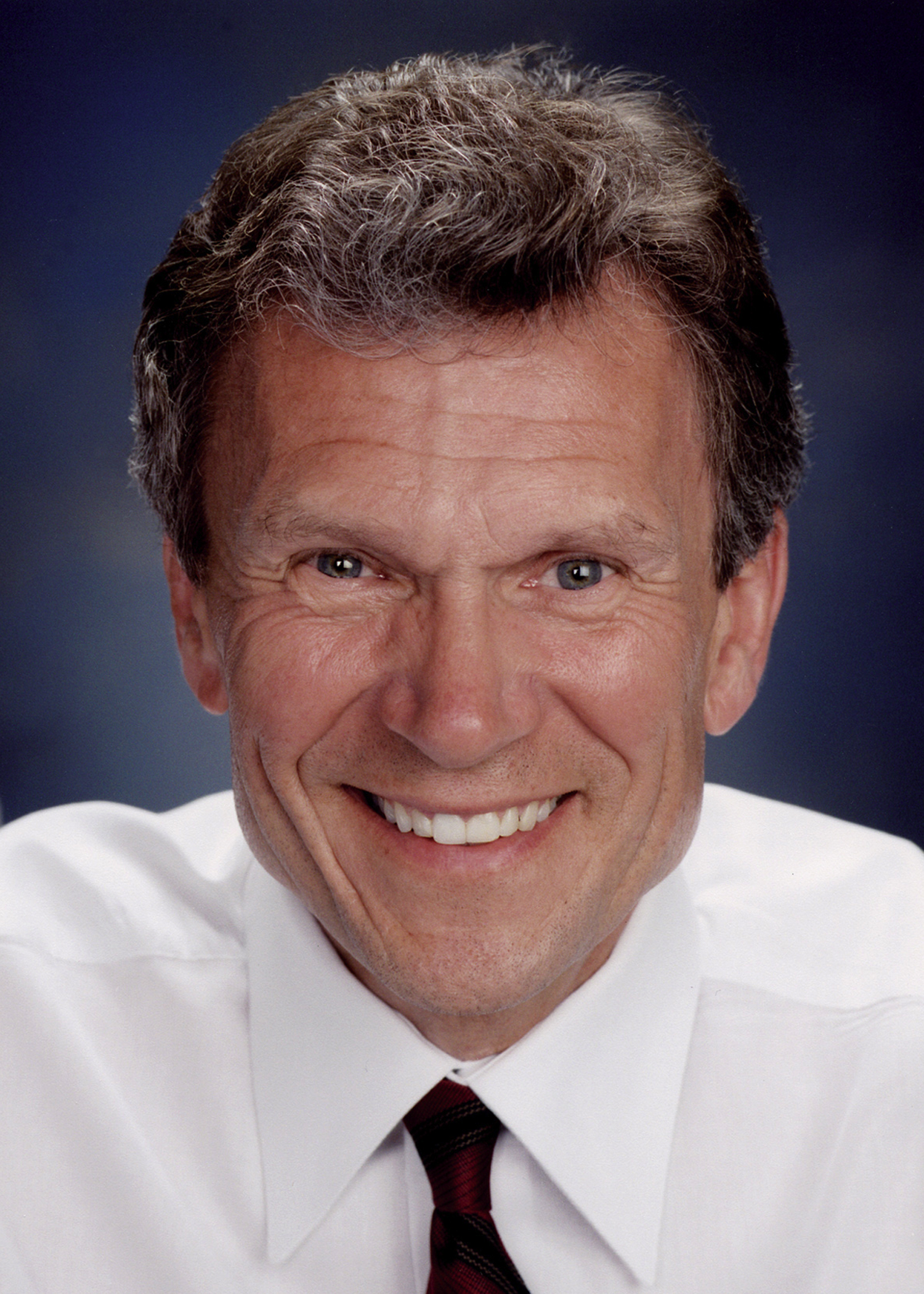
Democratic leader
Tom Daschle

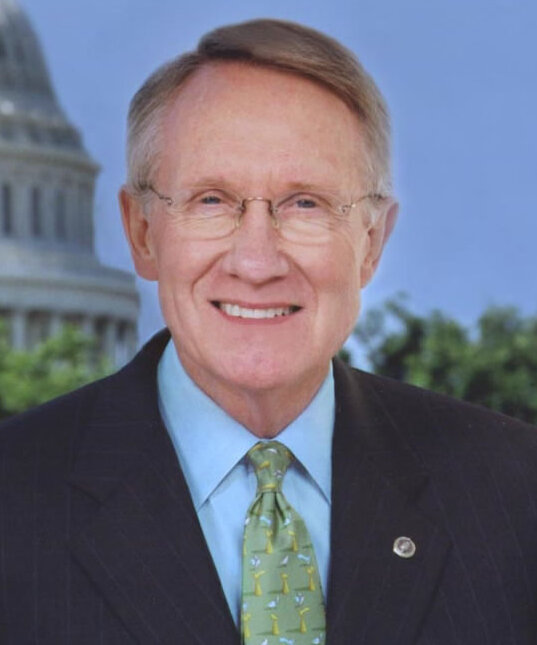
Democratic whip
Harry Reid

=== House of Representatives ===
Alabama — Alaska — Arizona — Arkansas — California — Colorado — Connecticut — Delaware — Florida — Georgia — Hawaii — Idaho — Illinois — Indiana — Iowa — Kansas — Kentucky — Louisiana — Maine — Maryland — Massachusetts — Michigan — Minnesota — Mississippi — Missouri — Montana — Nebraska — Nevada — New Hampshire — New Jersey — New Mexico — New York — North Carolina — North Dakota — Ohio — Oklahoma — Oregon — Pennsylvania — Rhode Island — South Carolina — South Dakota — Tennessee — Texas — Utah — Vermont — Virginia — Washington — West Virginia — Wisconsin — Wyoming — Non-voting members

==== Alabama ====
▌1. Sonny Callahan (R)
▌2. Terry Everett (R)
▌3. Bob Riley (R)
▌4. Robert Aderholt (R)
▌5. Bud Cramer (D)
▌6. Spencer Bachus (R)
▌7. Earl Hilliard Sr. (D)

==== Alaska ====
▌At-large. Don Young (R)

==== Arizona ====
▌1. Matt Salmon (R)
▌2. Ed Pastor (D)
▌3. Bob Stump (R)
▌4. John Shadegg (R)
▌5. Jim Kolbe (R)
▌6. J. D. Hayworth (R)

==== Arkansas ====
▌1. Robert Marion Berry (D)
▌2. Vic Snyder (D)
▌3. Asa Hutchinson (R)
▌4. Jay Dickey (R)

==== California ====
▌1. Mike Thompson (D)
▌2. Wally Herger (R)
▌3. Doug Ose (R)
▌4. John Doolittle (R)
▌5. Robert Matsui (D)
▌6. Lynn Woolsey (D)
▌7. George Miller (D)
▌8. Nancy Pelosi (D)
▌9. Barbara Lee (D)
▌10. Ellen Tauscher (D)
▌11. Richard Pombo (R)
▌12. Tom Lantos (D)
▌13. Pete Stark (D)
▌14. Anna Eshoo (D)
▌15. Tom Campbell (R)
▌16. Zoe Lofgren (D)
▌17. Sam Farr (D)
▌18. Gary Condit (D)
▌19. George Radanovich (R)
▌20. Cal Dooley (D)
▌21. Bill Thomas (R)
▌22. Lois Capps (D)
▌23. Elton Gallegly (R)
▌24. Brad Sherman (D)
▌25. Buck McKeon (R)
▌26. Howard Berman (D)
▌27. James E. Rogan (R)
▌28. David Dreier (R)
▌29. Henry Waxman (D)
▌30. Xavier Becerra (D)
▌▌31. Matthew G. Martínez (D, switched to R July 27, 2000)
▌32. Julian Dixon (D), until December 8, 2000, vacant thereafter
▌33. Lucille Roybal-Allard (D)
▌34. Grace Napolitano (D)
▌35. Maxine Waters (D)
▌36. Steven Kuykendall (R)
▌37. Juanita Millender-McDonald (D)
▌38. Steve Horn (R)
▌39. Ed Royce (R)
▌40. Jerry Lewis (R)
▌41. Gary Miller (R)
▌42. George Brown Jr. (D), until July 15, 1999

▌Joe Baca (D), from November 16, 1999

▌43. Ken Calvert (R)
▌44. Mary Bono (R)
▌45. Dana Rohrabacher (R)
▌46. Loretta Sanchez (D)
▌47. Christopher Cox (R)
▌48. Ron Packard (R)
▌49. Brian Bilbray (R)
▌50. Bob Filner (D)
▌51. Duke Cunningham (R)
▌52. Duncan L. Hunter (R)

==== Colorado ====
▌1. Diana DeGette (D)
▌2. Mark Udall (D)
▌3. Scott McInnis (R)
▌4. Bob Schaffer (R)
▌5. Joel Hefley (R)
▌6. Tom Tancredo (R)

==== Connecticut ====
▌1. John B. Larson (D)
▌2. Sam Gejdenson (D)
▌3. Rosa DeLauro (D)
▌4. Chris Shays (R)
▌5. James H. Maloney (D)
▌6. Nancy Johnson (R)

==== Delaware ====
▌At-large. Mike Castle (R)

==== Florida ====
▌1. Joe Scarborough (R)
▌2. Allen Boyd (D)
▌3. Corrine Brown (D)
▌4. Tillie Fowler (R)
▌5. Karen Thurman (D)
▌6. Cliff Stearns (R)
▌7. John Mica (R)
▌8. Bill McCollum (R)
▌9. Michael Bilirakis (R)
▌10. Bill Young (R)
▌11. Jim Davis (D)
▌12. Charles T. Canady (R)
▌13. Dan Miller (R)
▌14. Porter Goss (R)
▌15. Dave Weldon (R)
▌16. Mark Foley (R)
▌17. Carrie Meek (D)
▌18. Ileana Ros-Lehtinen (R)
▌19. Robert Wexler (D)
▌20. Peter Deutsch (D)
▌21. Lincoln Diaz-Balart (R)
▌22. Clay Shaw (R)
▌23. Alcee Hastings (D)

==== Georgia ====
▌1. Jack Kingston (R)
▌2. Sanford Bishop (D)
▌3. Mac Collins (R)
▌4. Cynthia McKinney (D)
▌5. John Lewis (D)
▌6. Johnny Isakson (R), from February 23, 1999
▌7. Bob Barr (R)
▌8. Saxby Chambliss (R)
▌9. Nathan Deal (R)
▌10. Charlie Norwood (R)
▌11. John Linder (R)

==== Hawaii ====
▌1. Neil Abercrombie (D)
▌2. Patsy Mink (D)

==== Idaho ====
▌1. Helen Chenoweth (R)
▌2. Mike Simpson (R)

==== Illinois ====
▌1. Bobby Rush (D)
▌2. Jesse Jackson Jr. (D)
▌3. William Lipinski (D)
▌4. Luis Gutierrez (D)
▌5. Rod Blagojevich (D)
▌6. Henry Hyde (R)
▌7. Danny K. Davis (D)
▌8. Philip Crane (R)
▌9. Jan Schakowsky (D)
▌10. John Porter (R)
▌11. Jerry Weller (R)
▌12. Jerry Costello (D)
▌13. Judy Biggert (R)
▌14. Dennis Hastert (R)
▌15. Thomas W. Ewing (R)
▌16. Don Manzullo (R)
▌17. Lane Evans (D)
▌18. Ray LaHood (R)
▌19. David D. Phelps (D)
▌20. John Shimkus (R)

==== Indiana ====
▌1. Pete Visclosky (D)
▌2. David M. McIntosh (R)
▌3. Tim Roemer (D)
▌4. Mark Souder (R)
▌5. Steve Buyer (R)
▌6. Dan Burton (R)
▌7. Edward A. Pease (R)
▌8. John Hostettler (R)
▌9. Baron Hill (D)
▌10. Julia Carson (D)

==== Iowa ====
▌1. Jim Leach (R)
▌2. Jim Nussle (R)
▌3. Leonard Boswell (D)
▌4. Greg Ganske (R)
▌5. Tom Latham (R)

==== Kansas ====
▌1. Jerry Moran (R)
▌2. Jim Ryun (R)
▌3. Dennis Moore (D)
▌4. Todd Tiahrt (R)

==== Kentucky ====
▌1. Ed Whitfield (R)
▌2. Ron Lewis (R)
▌3. Anne Northup (R)
▌4. Ken Lucas (D)
▌5. Hal Rogers (R)
▌6. Ernie Fletcher (R)

==== Louisiana ====
▌1. Bob Livingston (R), until March 1, 1999

▌David Vitter (R), from May 29, 1999

▌2. William J. Jefferson (D)
▌3. Billy Tauzin (R)
▌4. Jim McCrery (R)
▌5. John Cooksey (R)
▌6. Richard H. Baker (R)
▌7. Chris John (D)

==== Maine ====
▌1. Tom Allen (D)
▌2. John Baldacci (D)

==== Maryland ====
▌1. Wayne Gilchrest (R)
▌2. Bob Ehrlich (R)
▌3. Ben Cardin (D)
▌4. Albert Wynn (D)
▌5. Steny Hoyer (D)
▌6. Roscoe Bartlett (R)
▌7. Elijah Cummings (D)
▌8. Connie Morella (R)

==== Massachusetts ====
▌1. John Olver (D)
▌2. Richard Neal (D)
▌3. Jim McGovern (D)
▌4. Barney Frank (D)
▌5. Marty Meehan (D)
▌6. John F. Tierney (D)
▌7. Ed Markey (D)
▌8. Mike Capuano (D)
▌9. Joe Moakley (D)
▌10. Bill Delahunt (D)

==== Michigan ====
▌1. Bart Stupak (D)
▌2. Peter Hoekstra (R)
▌3. Vern Ehlers (R)
▌4. David Lee Camp (R)
▌5. James A. Barcia (D)
▌6. Fred Upton (R)
▌7. Nick Smith (R)
▌8. Debbie Stabenow (D)
▌9. Dale Kildee (D)
▌10. David Bonior (D)
▌11. Joe Knollenberg (R)
▌12. Sander Levin (D)
▌13. Lynn N. Rivers (D)
▌14. John Conyers (D)
▌15. Carolyn Cheeks Kilpatrick (D)
▌16. John Dingell (D)

==== Minnesota ====
▌1. Gil Gutknecht (R)
▌2. David Minge (DFL)
▌3. Jim Ramstad (R)
▌4. Bruce Vento (DFL), until October 10, 2000, vacant thereafter
▌5. Martin Olav Sabo (DFL)
▌6. Bill Luther (DFL)
▌7. Collin Peterson (DFL)
▌8. Jim Oberstar (DFL)

==== Mississippi ====
▌1. Roger Wicker (R)
▌2. Bennie Thompson (D)
▌3. Chip Pickering (R)
▌4. Ronnie Shows (D)
▌5. Gene Taylor (D)

==== Missouri ====
▌1. Bill Clay (D)
▌2. Jim Talent (R)
▌3. Dick Gephardt (D)
▌4. Ike Skelton (D)
▌5. Karen McCarthy (D)
▌6. Pat Danner (D)
▌7. Roy Blunt (R)
▌8. Jo Ann Emerson (R)
▌9. Kenny Hulshof (R)

==== Montana ====
▌At-large. Rick Hill (R)

==== Nebraska ====
▌1. Doug Bereuter (R)
▌2. Lee Terry (R)
▌3. Bill Barrett (R)

==== Nevada ====
▌1. Shelley Berkley (D)
▌2. Jim Gibbons (R)

==== New Hampshire ====
▌1. John E. Sununu (R)
▌2. Charles Bass (R)

==== New Jersey ====
▌1. Rob Andrews (D)
▌2. Frank LoBiondo (R)
▌3. H. James Saxton (R)
▌4. Chris Smith (R)
▌5. Marge Roukema (R)
▌6. Frank Pallone (D)
▌7. Bob Franks (R)
▌8. Bill Pascrell (D)
▌9. Steve Rothman (D)
▌10. Donald M. Payne (D)
▌11. Rodney Frelinghuysen (R)
▌12. Rush Holt Jr. (D)
▌13. Bob Menendez (D)

==== New Mexico ====
▌1. Heather Wilson (R)
▌2. Joe Skeen (R)
▌3. Tom Udall (D)

==== New York ====
▌▌1. Michael Forbes (R), switched to (D) July 17, 1999
▌2. Rick Lazio (R)
▌3. Peter T. King (R)
▌4. Carolyn McCarthy (D)
▌5. Gary Ackerman (D)
▌6. Gregory Meeks (D)
▌7. Joe Crowley (D)
▌8. Jerry Nadler (D)
▌9. Anthony Weiner (D)
▌10. Edolphus Towns (D)
▌11. Major Owens (D)
▌12. Nydia Velázquez (D)
▌13. Vito Fossella (R)
▌14. Carolyn Maloney (D)
▌15. Charles Rangel (D)
▌16. José E. Serrano (D)
▌17. Eliot Engel (D)
▌18. Nita Lowey (D)
▌19. Sue W. Kelly (R)
▌20. Benjamin Gilman (R)
▌21. Michael R. McNulty (D)
▌22. John E. Sweeney (R)
▌23. Sherwood Boehlert (R)
▌24. John M. McHugh (R)
▌25. James T. Walsh (R)
▌26. Maurice Hinchey (D)
▌27. Thomas M. Reynolds (R)
▌28. Louise Slaughter (D)
▌29. John J. LaFalce (D)
▌30. Jack Quinn (R)
▌31. Amo Houghton (R)

==== North Carolina ====
▌1. Eva Clayton (D)
▌2. Bob Etheridge (D)
▌3. Walter B. Jones Jr. (R)
▌4. David Price (D)
▌5. Richard Burr (R)
▌6. Howard Coble (R)
▌7. Mike McIntyre (D)
▌8. Robin Hayes (R)
▌9. Sue Myrick (R)
▌10. Cass Ballenger (R)
▌11. Charles H. Taylor (R)
▌12. Mel Watt (D)

==== North Dakota ====
▌At-large. Earl Pomeroy (D-NPL)

==== Ohio ====
▌1. Steve Chabot (R)
▌2. Rob Portman (R)
▌3. Tony P. Hall (D)
▌4. Mike Oxley (R)
▌5. Paul Gillmor (R)
▌6. Ted Strickland (D)
▌7. Dave Hobson (R)
▌8. John Boehner (R)
▌9. Marcy Kaptur (D)
▌10. Dennis Kucinich (D)
▌11. Stephanie Tubbs Jones (D)
▌12. John Kasich (R)
▌13. Sherrod Brown (D)
▌14. Thomas C. Sawyer (D)
▌15. Deborah Pryce (R)
▌16. Ralph Regula (R)
▌17. James Traficant (D)
▌18. Bob Ney (R)
▌19. Steve LaTourette (R)

==== Oklahoma ====
▌1. Steve Largent (R)
▌2. Tom Coburn (R)
▌3. Wes Watkins (R)
▌4. J. C. Watts (R)
▌5. Ernest Istook (R)
▌6. Frank Lucas (R)

==== Oregon ====
▌1. David Wu (D)
▌2. Greg Walden (R)
▌3. Earl Blumenauer (D)
▌4. Peter DeFazio (D)
▌5. Darlene Hooley (D)

==== Pennsylvania ====
▌1. Bob Brady (D)
▌2. Chaka Fattah (D)
▌3. Robert A. Borski Jr. (D)
▌4. Ron Klink (D)
▌5. John E. Peterson (R)
▌6. Tim Holden (D)
▌7. Curt Weldon (R)
▌8. James C. Greenwood (R)
▌9. Bud Shuster (R)
▌10. Don Sherwood (R)
▌11. Paul Kanjorski (D)
▌12. John Murtha (D)
▌13. Joe Hoeffel (D)
▌14. William J. Coyne (D)
▌15. Pat Toomey (R)
▌16. Joe Pitts (R)
▌17. George Gekas (R)
▌18. Mike Doyle (D)
▌19. William F. Goodling (R)
▌20. Frank Mascara (D)
▌21. Phil English (R)

==== Rhode Island ====
▌1. Patrick J. Kennedy (D)
▌2. Robert Weygand (D)

==== South Carolina ====
▌1. Mark Sanford (R)
▌2. Floyd Spence (R)
▌3. Lindsey Graham (R)
▌4. Jim DeMint (R)
▌5. John Spratt (D)
▌6. Jim Clyburn (D)

==== South Dakota ====
▌At-large. John Thune (R)

==== Tennessee ====
▌1. Bill Jenkins (R)
▌2. Jimmy Duncan (R)
▌3. Zach Wamp (R)
▌4. Van Hilleary (R)
▌5. Bob Clement (D)
▌6. Bart Gordon (D)
▌7. Ed Bryant (R)
▌8. John S. Tanner (D)
▌9. Harold Ford Jr. (D)

==== Texas ====
▌1. Max Sandlin (D)
▌2. Jim Turner (D)
▌3. Sam Johnson (R)
▌4. Ralph Hall (D)
▌5. Pete Sessions (R)
▌6. Joe Barton (R)
▌7. Bill Archer (R)
▌8. Kevin Brady (R)
▌9. Nick Lampson (D)
▌10. Lloyd Doggett (D)
▌11. Chet Edwards (D)
▌12. Kay Granger (R)
▌13. Mac Thornberry (R)
▌14. Ron Paul (R)
▌15. Rubén Hinojosa (D)
▌16. Silvestre Reyes (D)
▌17. Charles Stenholm (D)
▌18. Sheila Jackson-Lee (D)
▌19. Larry Combest (R)
▌20. Charlie Gonzalez (D)
▌21. Lamar Smith (R)
▌22. Tom DeLay (R)
▌23. Henry Bonilla (R)
▌24. Martin Frost (D)
▌25. Ken Bentsen (D)
▌26. Dick Armey (R)
▌27. Solomon P. Ortiz (D)
▌28. Ciro Rodriguez (D)
▌29. Gene Green (D)
▌30. Eddie Bernice Johnson (D)

==== Utah ====
▌1. James V. Hansen (R)
▌2. Merrill Cook (R)
▌3. Chris Cannon (R)

==== Vermont ====
▌At-large. Bernie Sanders (I)

==== Virginia ====
▌1. Herbert H. Bateman (R), until September 11, 2000, vacant thereafter
▌2. Owen B. Pickett (D)
▌3. Bobby Scott (D)
▌4. Norman Sisisky (D)
▌▌5. Virgil Goode (D, switched to I January 27, 2000)
▌6. Bob Goodlatte (R)
▌7. Thomas J. Bliley Jr. (R)
▌8. Jim Moran (D)
▌9. Rick Boucher (D)
▌10. Frank Wolf (R)
▌11. Tom Davis (R)

==== Washington ====
▌1. Jay Inslee (D)
▌2. Jack Metcalf (R)
▌3. Brian Baird (D)
▌4. Doc Hastings (R)
▌5. George Nethercutt (R)
▌6. Norm Dicks (D)
▌7. Jim McDermott (D)
▌8. Jennifer Dunn (R)
▌9. Adam Smith (D)

==== West Virginia ====
▌1. Alan Mollohan (D)
▌2. Bob Wise (D)
▌3. Nick Rahall (D)

==== Wisconsin ====
▌1. Paul Ryan (R)
▌2. Tammy Baldwin (D)
▌3. Ron Kind (D)
▌4. Jerry Kleczka (D)
▌5. Tom Barrett (D)
▌6. Tom Petri (R)
▌7. Dave Obey (D)
▌8. Mark Andrew Green (R)
▌9. Jim Sensenbrenner (R)

==== Wyoming ====
▌At-large. Barbara Cubin (R)

==== Non-voting members ====
▌American Samoa. Eni Faleomavaega (D)
▌District of Columbia. Eleanor Holmes Norton (D)
▌Guam. Robert A. Underwood (D)
▌Puerto Rico. Carlos Romero Barceló (Resident Commissioner) (D/PNP)
▌Virgin Islands. Donna Christian-Christensen (D)

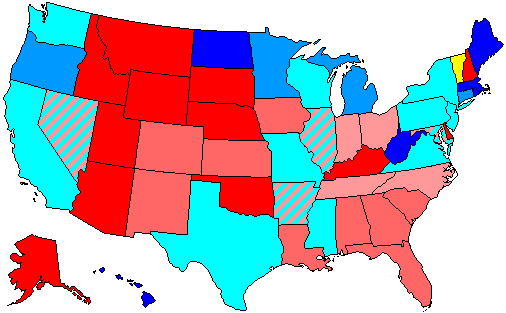
House seats by party holding majority from state: 80+% Democratic / 80+% Republican; 60+ to 80% Democratic / 60+ to 80% Republican; Up to 60% Democratic / Up to 60% Republican; Striped: Even Democratic/Republican split 100% independent

House majority leadership

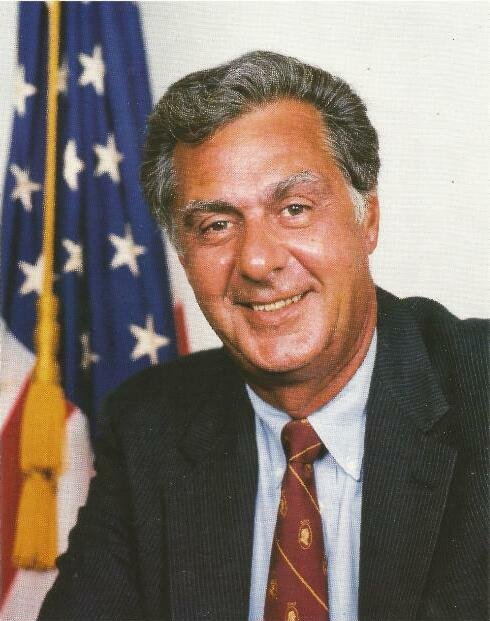
Republican leader
Dick Armey

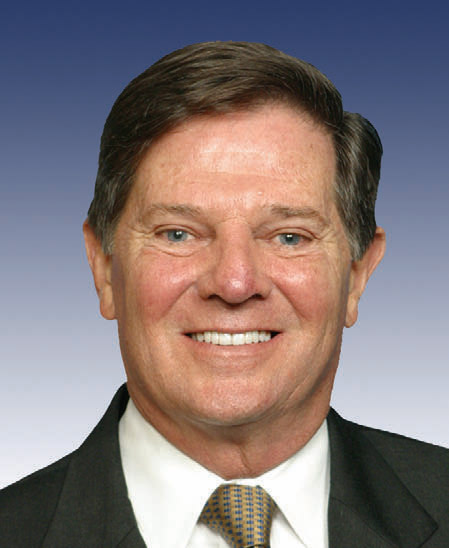
Republican whip
Tom DeLay

House minority leadership

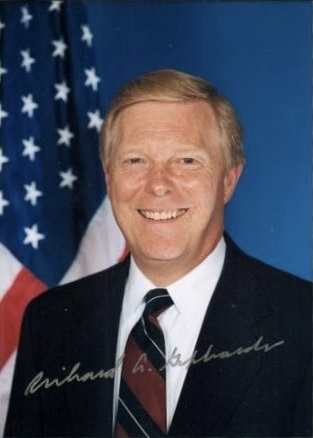
Democratic leader
Dick Gephardt

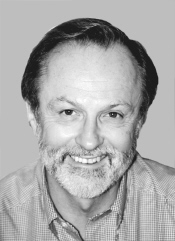
Democratic whip
David Bonior

== Changes in membership ==
=== Senate ===
Senate changes
State (class)	Vacated by	Reason for change	Successor	Date of successor's formal installation (Note: When seated or oath administered, not necessarily when service began.)
Rhode Island (1)	John Chafee (R)	Incumbent died October 24, 1999, having already planned to retire at the end of the term. Successor appointed on November 2, 1999, and later elected for a full six-year term.	Lincoln Chafee (R)	November 2, 1999
Georgia (3)	Paul Coverdell (R)	Incumbent died July 18, 2000. Successor appointed on July 24, 2000, and later elected to finish the term ending January 3, 2005.	Zell Miller (D)	July 24, 2000

=== House of Representatives ===
House changes
District	Vacated by	Reason for change	Successor	Date of successor's formal installation
Georgia 6th	Vacant	Newt Gingrich (R) resigned January 3, 1999, shortly before the beginning of this Congress, and declined to take office after being re-elected. Successor elected February 23, 1999.	Johnny Isakson (R)	February 23, 1999
Louisiana 1st	Bob Livingston (R)	Incumbent resigned March 1, 1999. Successor elected May 29, 1999.	David Vitter (R)	May 29, 1999
California 42nd	George Brown Jr. (D)	Incumbent died July 15, 1999. Successor elected November 16, 1999.	Joe Baca (D)	November 16, 1999
New York 1st	Michael Forbes (R)	Changed political affiliation July 17, 1999.	Michael Forbes (D)	July 17, 1999
Virginia 5th	Virgil Goode (D)	Changed party affiliation January 27, 2000.	Virgil Goode (I)	January 27, 2000
California 31st	Matthew G. Martínez (D)	Changed party affiliation July 27, 2000.	Matthew G. Martínez (R)	July 27, 2000
Virginia 1st	Herbert H. Bateman (R)	Incumbent died September 11, 2000, having already planned to retire at the end of the term.	Seat vacant until next Congress	
Minnesota 4th	Bruce Vento (D)	Incumbent died October 10, 2000, having already planned to retire at the end of the term.	Seat vacant until next Congress	
California 32nd	Julian Dixon (D)	Incumbent died December 8, 2000.	Seat vacant until next Congress	

== Committees ==
For members (House and Senate) of the committees and their assignments, go into the Official Congressional Directory at the bottom of the article and click on the link (1 link), in the directory after the pages of terms of service, you will see the committees of the Senate, House (Standing with Subcommittees, Select and Special) and Joint and after the committee pages, you will see the House/Senate committee assignments in the directory, on the committees section of the House and Senate in the Official Congressional Directory, the committee's members on the first row on the left side shows the chairman of the committee and on the right side shows the ranking member of the committee.

=== Senate ===
- Aging (Special) (Chair: Chuck Grassley, Ranking Member: John Breaux)
- Agriculture, Nutrition and Forestry (Chair: Richard Lugar, Ranking Member: Tom Harkin)
  - Forestry, Conservation and Rural Revitalization (Chair: Larry Craig)
  - Marketing Inspection and Product Promotion (Chair: Paul Coverdell)
  - Production and Price Competitiveness (Chair: Pat Roberts)
  - Research, Nutrition and General Legislation (Chair: Peter Fitzgerald)
- Appropriations (Chair: Ted Stevens, Ranking Member: Robert Byrd)
  - Agriculture, Rural Development and Related Agencies (Chair: Thad Cochran)
  - Commerce, Justice, State and the Judiciary (Chair: Judd Gregg)
  - Defense (Chair: Ted Stevens)
  - District of Columbia (Chair: Kay Bailey Hutchison)
  - Energy and Water Development (Chair: Pete Domenici)
  - Foreign Operations (Chair: Mitch McConnell)
  - Interior (Chair: Slade Gorton)
  - Labor, Health, Human Services and Education (Chair: Arlen Specter)
  - Legislative Branch (Chair: Robert F. Bennett)
  - Military Construction (Chair: Conrad Burns)
  - Transportation (Chair: Richard Shelby)
  - Treasury and General Government (Chair: Ben Nighthorse Campbell)
  - VA, HUD and Independent Agencies (Chair: Kit Bond)
- Armed Services (Chair: John Warner, Ranking Member: Carl Levin)
  - Airland (Chair: Rick Santorum)
  - Emerging Threats and Capabilities (Chair: Pat Roberts)
  - Personnel (Chair: Wayne Allard)
  - Readiness and Management Support (Chair: Jim Inhofe)
  - Seapower (Chair: Olympia Snowe)
  - Strategic (Chair: Bob Smith)
- Banking, Housing and Urban Affairs (Chair: Phil Gramm, Ranking Member: Paul Sarbanes)
  - Economic Policy (Chair: Connie Mack III)
  - Financial Institutions (Chair: Robert F. Bennett, Vice Chair: Chuck Hagel)
  - Housing and Transportation (Chair: Wayne Allard, Vice Chair: Rick Santorum)
  - International Trade and Finance (Chair: Mike Enzi, Vice Chair: Mike Crapo)
  - Securities (Chair: Rod Grams, Vice Chair: Jim Bunning)
- Budget (Chair: Pete Domenici, Ranking Member: Frank Lautenberg)
- Commerce, Science and Transportation (Chair: John McCain, Ranking Member: Fritz Hollings)
  - Aviation (Chair: Slade Gorton)
  - Communications (Chair: Conrad Burns)
  - Consumer Affairs, Foreign Commerce and Tourism (Chair: John Ashcroft)
  - Manufacturing and Competitiveness (Chair: Spencer Abraham)
  - Oceans and Fisheries (Chair: Olympia Snowe)
  - Surface Transportation and Merchant Marine (Chair: Bill Frist)
- Energy and Natural Resources (Chair: Frank Murkowski, Ranking Member: Jeff Bingaman)
  - Energy Research, Development, Production and Regulation (Chair: Don Nickles, Vice Chair: Pete Domenici)
  - Forests and Public Land Management (Chair: Larry Craig, Vice Chair: Conrad Burns)
  - National Parks, Historic Preservation and Recreation (Chair: Craig L. Thomas, Vice Chair: Ben Nighthorse Campbell)
  - Water and Power (Chair: Gordon H. Smith, Vice Chair: Slade Gorton)
- Environment and Public Works (Chair: John Chafee, then Bob Smith, Ranking Member: Max Baucus)
  - Clean Air, Wetlands, Private Property and Nuclear Safety (Chair: Jim Inhofe)
  - Fisheries, Wildlife, and Drinking Water (Chair: Mike Crapo)
  - Superfund, Waste Control and Risk Assessment (Chair: Bob Smith)
  - Transportation and Infrastructure (Chair: George Voinovich)
- Ethics (Select) (Chair: Pat Roberts, Ranking Member: Harry Reid)
- Finance (Chair: William V. Roth Jr., Ranking Member: Daniel Patrick Moynihan)
  - Health Care (Chair: John Chafee)
  - International Trade (Chair: Chuck Grassley)
  - Long-Term Growth and Debt Reduction (Chair: Frank Murkowski)
  - Social Security and Family Policy (Chair: Don Nickles)
  - Taxation and IRS Oversight (Chair: Orrin Hatch)
- Foreign Relations (Chair: Jesse Helms, Ranking Member: Joe Biden)
  - African Affairs (Chair: Bill Frist)
  - East Asian and Pacific Affairs (Chair: Craig L. Thomas)
  - European Affairs (Chair: Gordon H. Smith)
  - International Economic Policy, Export and Trade Promotion (Chair: Chuck Hagel)
  - International Operations (Chair: Rod Grams)
  - Near Eastern and South Asian Affairs (Chair: Sam Brownback)
  - Western Hemisphere, Peace Corps, Narcotics and Terrorism (Chair: Paul Coverdell)
- Governmental Affairs (Chair: Fred Thompson, Ranking Member: Joe Lieberman)
  - International Security, Proliferation and Federal Services (Chair: Thad Cochran)
  - Oversight of Government Management, Restructuring and the District of Columbia (Chair: George Voinovich)
  - Permanent Subcommittee on Investigations (Chair: Susan Collins)
- Indian Affairs (Select) (Chair: Ben Nighthorse Campbell, Ranking Member: Daniel Inouye)
- Intelligence (Select) (Chair: Richard Shelby, Ranking Member: Richard Bryan)
- Health, Education, Labor and Pensions (Chair: Jim Jeffords, Ranking Member: Ted Kennedy)
  - Children and Families (Chair: Judd Gregg)
  - Public Health (Chair: Bill Frist)
  - Aging (Chair: Mike DeWine)
  - Employment, Safety and Training (Chair: Mike Enzi)
- Judiciary (Chair: Orrin Hatch, Ranking Member: Patrick Leahy)
  - Administrative Oversight and the Courts (Chair: Chuck Grassley)
  - Antitrust, Business Rights and Competition (Chair: Mike DeWine)
  - Constitution, Federalism and Property Rights (Chair: John Ashcroft)
  - Criminal Justice Oversight (Chair: Strom Thurmond)
  - Immigration (Chair: Spencer Abraham)
  - Technology, Terrorism and Government Information (Chair: Jon Kyl)
  - Youth Violence (Chair: Jeff Sessions)
- Rules and Administration (Chair: Mitch McConnell, Ranking Member: Chris Dodd)
- Small Business (Chair: Kit Bond, Ranking Member: John Kerry)
- Veterans' Affairs (Chair: Arlen Specter, Ranking Member: Jay Rockefeller)

=== House of Representatives ===
- Agriculture (Chair: Larry Combest, Vice Chair: Bill Barrett, Ranking Member: Charles Stenholm)
  - Department Operations, Oversight, Nutrition and Forestry (Chair: Bob Goodlatte, Vice Chair: Thomas W. Ewing)
  - General Farm Commodities, Resource Conservation and Credit (Chair: Bill Barrett, Vice Chair: John A. Boehner)
  - Livestock and Horticulture (Chair: Richard Pombo, Vice Chair: John A. Boehner)
  - Risk Management, Research and Specialty Crops (Chair: Thomas W. Ewing, Vice Chair: Bill Barrett)
- Appropriations (Chair: Bill Young, Ranking Member: Dave Obey)
  - Agriculture, Rural Development, Food and Drug Administration and Related Agencies (Chair: Joe Skeen)
  - Commerce, Justice, State and Judiciary (Chair: Hal Rogers)
  - Defense (Chair: Jerry Lewis)
  - District of Columbia (Chair: Ernest J. Istook)
  - Energy and Water Development (Chair: Ron Packard)
  - Foreign Operations, Export Financing and Related Programs (Chair: Sonny Callahan)
  - Interior (Chair: Ralph Regula)
  - Labor, Health, Human Services and Education (Chair: John Edward Porter)
  - Legislative (Chair: Charles H. Taylor)
  - Military Construction (Chair: David L. Hobson)
  - Transportation (Chair: Frank Wolf)
  - Treasury, Postal Service and General Government (Chair: Jim Kolbe)
  - VA-HUD Independent Agencies (Chair: James T. Walsh)
- Armed Services (Chair: Floyd Spence, Vice Chair: Bob Stump, Ranking Member: Ike Skelton)
  - Military Installations and Facilities (Chair: Joel Hefley)
  - Military Personnel (Chair: Steve Buyer)
  - Military Procurement (Chair: Duncan L. Hunter)
  - Military Readiness (Chair: Herbert Bateman, Vice Chair: Walter B. Jones Jr.)
  - Military Research and Development (Chair: Curt Weldon)
  - Special Oversight Panel on Morale, Welfare and Recreation (Chair: John M. McHugh, Vice Chair: Bob Riley)
  - Special Oversight Panel on the Merchant Marine (Chair: Herbert Bateman)
- Banking and Financial Services (Chair: Jim Leach, Vice Chair: Steven T. Kuykendall, Ranking Member: John LaFalce)
  - Capital Markets, Securities and Government Sponsored Enterprises (Chair: Richard Baker, Vice Chair: Frank D. Lucas)
  - Domestic and International Monetary Policy (Chair: Spencer Bachus, Vice Chair: Ron Paul)
  - Financial Institutions and Consumer Credit (Chair: Marge Roukema, Vice Chair: Bill McCollum)
  - General Oversight and Investigations (Chair: Peter T. King, Vice Chair: Steven C. LaTourette)
  - Housing and Community Opportunity (Chair: Rick Lazio, Vice Chair: Robert W. Ney)
- Budget (Chair: John Kasich, Ranking Member: John Spratt)
- Commerce (Chair: Thomas J. Bliley Jr., Vice Chair: Paul E. Gillmor, Ranking Member: John Dingell)
  - Energy and Power (Chair: Joe Barton, Vice Chair: Cliff Stearns)
  - Finance and Hazardous Materials (Chair: Mike Oxley, Vice Chair: Billy Tauzin)
  - Health and the Environment (Chair: Michael Bilirakis, Vice Chair: Tom Coburn)
  - Oversight and Investigations (Chair: Fred Upton, Vice Chair: Richard Burr)
  - Telecommunications, Trade and Consumer Protection (Chair: Billy Tauzin, Vice Chair: Mike Oxley)
- Education and the Workforce (Chair: William F. Goodling, Vice Chair: William F. Goodling, Ranking Member: Bill Clay)
  - Employer-Employee Relations (Chair: John A. Boehner, Vice Chair: Ernie Fletcher)
  - Workforce Protections (Chair: Cass Ballenger, Vice Chair: Bill Barrett)
  - Oversight and Investigations (Chair: Peter Hoekstra. Vice Chair: Charles W. Norwood Jr.)
  - Postsecondary Education, Training and Life-Long Learning (Chair: Buck McKeon, Vice Chair: Lindsey O. Graham)
  - Early Childhood, Youth and Families (Chair: Michael Castle, Vice Chair: Bob Schaffer)
- Government Reform (Chair: Dan Burton, Vice Chair: Steve LaTourette, Ranking Member: Henry Waxman)
  - Census (Chair: Dan Miller, Vice Chair: John T. Doolittle)
  - Civil Service (Chair: Joe Scarborough, Vice Chair: Asa Hutchinson)
  - Criminal Justice, Drug Policy and Human Resources (Chair: John Mica, Vice Chair: Bob Barr)
  - District of Columbia (Chair: Richard Baker, Vice Chair: Connie Morella)
  - Government Management, Information and Technology (Chair: Stephen Horn, Vice Chair: Judy Biggert)
  - National Economic Growth, Natural Resources and Regulatory Affairs (Chair: David M. McIntosh, Vice Chair: Paul Ryan)
  - National Security, Veterans' Affairs and International Relations (Chair: Christopher Shays, Vice Chair: Mark E. Souder)
  - Postal Service (Chair: John M. McHugh, Vice Chair: Mark Souder)
- House Administration (Chair: Bill Thomas, Ranking Member: Steny Hoyer)
- International Relations (Chair: Benjamin A. Gilman, Ranking Member: Sam Gejdenson)
  - Africa (Chair: Edward Royce)
  - Asia and the Pacific (Chair: Doug Bereuter)
  - International Operations and Human Rights (Chair: Chris Smith)
  - Western Hemisphere (Chair: Elton Gallegly)
  - International Economic Policy and Trade (Chair: Ileana Ros-Lehtinen)
- Judiciary (Chair: Henry J. Hyde, Ranking Member: John Conyers)
  - Commercial and Administrative Law (Chair: George Gekas)
  - The Constitution (Chair: Charles T. Canady)
  - Courts and Intellectual Property (Chair: Howard Coble)
  - Crime (Chair: Bill McCollum)
  - Immigration and Claims (Chair: Lamar Smith)
- Resources (Chair: Don Young, Ranking Member: George Miller)
  - Energy and Mineral Resources (Chair: Barbara Cubin)
  - Fisheries Conservation, Wildlife and Oceans (Chair: Jim Saxton)
  - National Parks and Public Lands (Chair: James V. Hansen)
  - Forests and Forest Health (Chair: Helen Chenoweth)
  - Water and Power (Chair: John T. Doolittle)
- Rules (Chair: David Dreier, Vice Chair: Porter Goss, Ranking Member: Joe Moakley)
  - The Legislative Process (Chair: Porter Goss, Vice Chair: Deborah Pryce)
  - The Rules and Organizations of the House (Chair: John Linder, Vice Chair: Lincoln Diaz-Balart)
- Science (Chair: Jim Sensenbrenner, Vice Chair: Vern Ehlers, Ranking Member: George Brown Jr., then Ralph Hall)
  - Basic Research (Chair: Nick Smith, Vice Chair: Judy Biggert)
  - Energy and the Environment (Chair: Ken Calvert, Vice Chair: Gary G. Miller)
  - Space and Aeronautics (Chair: Dana Rohrabacher, Vice Chair: Dave Weldon)
  - Technology (Chair: Constance Morella, Vice Chair: Gil Gutknecht)
- Small Business (Chair: Jim Talent, Ranking Member: Nydia Velázquez)
  - Empowerment (Chair: Joseph R. Pitts, Vice Chair: Jim DeMint)
  - Government Programs and Oversight (Chair: Roscoe G. Bartlett, Vice Chair: Mary Bono)
  - Regulatory Reform and Paperwork Reduction (Chair: Sue Kelly, Vice Chair: John Thune)
  - Tax, Finance and Exports (Chair: Donald A. Manzullo, Vice Chair: Steve Chabot)
  - Rural Enterprises, Business Opportunities and Special Small Business Problems (Chair: Frank LoBiondo, Vice Chair: Rick Hill)
- Standards of Official Conduct (Chair: Lamar S. Smith, Ranking Member: Howard Berman)
- Transportation and Infrastructure (Chair: Bud Shuster, Vice Chair: Tom Petri, Ranking Member: Jim Oberstar)
  - Aviation (Chair: John J. Duncan Jr., Vice Chair: John E. Sweeney)
  - Coast Guard and Maritime Transportation (Chair: Wayne T. Gilchrest, Vice Chair: Frank A. LoBiondo)
  - Economic Development, Public Buildings, Hazardous Materials and Pipeline Transportation (Chair: Bob Franks, Vice Chair: John Cooksey)
  - Ground Transportation (Chair: Tom Petri, Vice Chair: Bob Franks)
  - Oversight, Investigations and Emergency Management (Chair: Tillie K. Fowler, Vice Chair: Lee Terry)
  - Water Resources and Environment (Chair: Sherwood L. Boehlert, Vice Chair: Don Sherwood)
- Veterans' Affairs (Chair: Bob Stump, Vice Chair: Chris Smith, Ranking Member: Lane Evans)
  - Health (Chair: Cliff Stearns, Vice Chair: Michael Bilirakis)
  - Benefits (Chair: Jack Quinn, Vice Chair: J.D. Hayworth)
  - Oversight and Investigations (Chair: Terry Everett)
- Ways and Means (Chair: William Reynolds Archer Jr., Ranking Member: Charles Rangel)
  - Health (Chair: Bill Thomas)
  - Human Resources (Chair: Nancy Johnson)
  - Oversight (Chair: Amo Houghton)
  - Social Security (Chair: Clay Shaw)
  - Trade (Chair: Phil Crane)
- Whole

=== Joint committees ===
- Economic (Chair: Sen. Connie Mack III, Vice Chair: Rep. Jim Saxton)
- Taxation (Chair: Rep. Bill Archer, Vice Chair: Sen. William V. Roth)
- The Library (Chair: Sen. Ted Stevens, Vice Chair: Rep. Bill Thomas)
- Printing (Chair: Bill Thomas, Vice Chair: Rep. Mitch McConnell)

== Employees ==
=== Legislative branch agency directors ===
- Architect of the Capitol: Alan M. Hantman
- Attending Physician of the United States Congress: John F. Eisold
- Comptroller General of the United States: David M. Walker
- Director of the Congressional Budget Office: June E. O'Neill, until January 29, 1999
  - James Blum, January 29, 1999 - February 3, 1999
  - Dan Crippen, from February 3, 1999
- Librarian of Congress: James H. Billington
- Public Printer of the United States: Michael F. DiMario

=== Senate ===
- Chaplain: Lloyd John Ogilvie (Presbyterian)
- Curator: Diane K. Skvarla
- Historian: Richard A. Baker
- Parliamentarian: Bob Dove
- Secretary: Gary Lee Sisco
- Librarian: Greg Harness
- Secretary for the Majority: Elizabeth B. Letchworth
- Secretary for the Minority: Martin P. Paone
- Sergeant at Arms: James W. Ziglar

=== House of Representatives ===
- Chaplain: James D. Ford (Lutheran), until March 23, 2000
  - Daniel P. Coughlin (Roman Catholic), from March 23, 2000
- Chief Administrative Officer: James M. Eagen III
- Clerk: Jeff Trandahl
- Reading Clerks:
  - Mary Kevin Niland (D)
  - Bob Berry (from July to November 1999) (R) along with Paul Hays (R)
- Inspector General: John W. Lainhart IV then Steven McNamara
- Parliamentarian: Charles W. Johnson
- Sergeant at Arms: Wilson Livingood

== Exoneration of Charles Butler McVay III ==
In October 2000, the United States Congress passed a Sense of Congress resolution that McVay's record should reflect that "he is exonerated for the loss of the USS Indianapolis." President Clinton also signed the resolution, which rightented the miscarriage of justice on Charles B. McVay III for the sinking of the USS Indianapolis on 30 July 1945 by Japanese submarine I-58 (1943).

== See also ==
- List of new members of the 106th Congress
- 1998 United States elections (elections leading to this Congress)
  - 1998 United States Senate elections
  - 1998 United States House of Representatives elections
- 2000 United States elections (elections during this Congress, leading to the next Congress)
  - 2000 United States presidential election
  - 2000 United States Senate elections
  - 2000 United States House of Representatives elections
