= Stafford Disaster Relief and Emergency Assistance Act =

US law designed to bring an orderly and systematic means of federal disaster assistance

- Other short titles: Disaster Relief and Emergency Assistance Amendments of 1988; Great Lakes Coastal Barrier Act of 1988; Great Lakes Erosion Damage Assistance and Prevention Act of 1988; Great Lakes Planning Assistance Act of 1988; Robert T. Stafford Disaster Relief and Emergency Assistance Act
- Long title: An Act to amend the Disaster Relief Act of 1974 to provide for more effective assistance in response to major disasters and emergencies, and for other purposes.
- Nicknames: Major Disaster Relief and Emergency Assistance Amendments of 1987
- Enacted by: the 100th United States Congress
- Effective: November 23, 1988

Citations
- Public law: 100-707
- Statutes at Large: 102 Stat. 4689

Codification
- Titles amended: 42: The Public Health and Welfare
- U.S.C. sections amended: 42 U.S.C. ch. 68 § 5121 et seq.

Legislative history
- Introduced in the House as H.R. 2707 by Tom Ridge (R–PA) on June 17, 1987; Committee consideration by House Transportation and Infrastructure, Senate Environment and Public Works; Passed the House on March 17, 1988 (Passed); Passed the Senate on October 21, 1988 (Passed) with amendment; House agreed to Senate amendment on October 21, 1988 (Agreed); Signed into law by President Ronald Reagan on November 23, 1988

Major amendments
- Disaster Assistance Deadlines Alignment Act

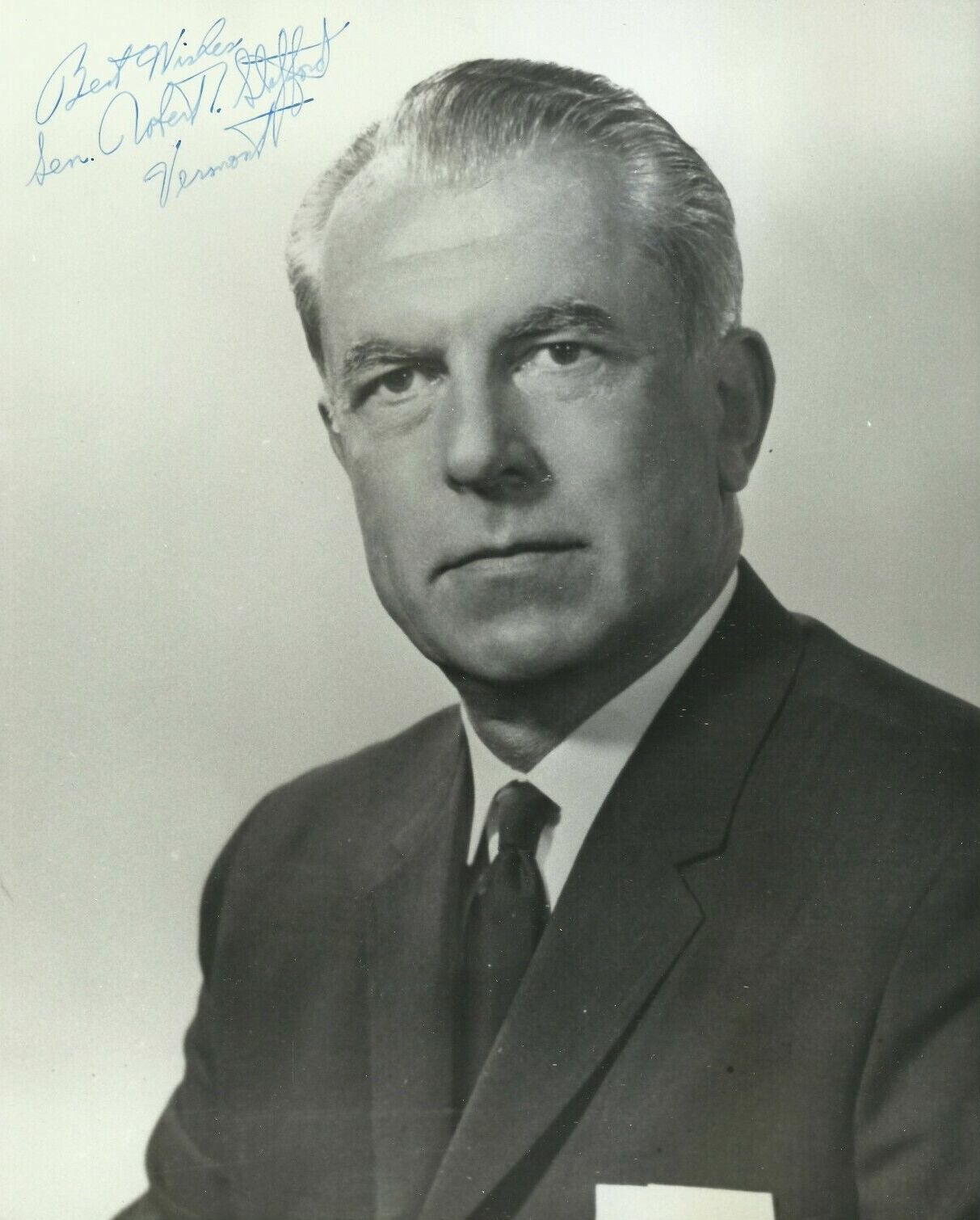
Sen. Robert T. Stafford (R-VT)

The Robert T. Stafford Disaster Relief and Emergency Assistance Act, commonly known as the Stafford Act, is a 1988 United States federal law designed to bring an orderly and systematic means of federal natural disaster assistance for state and local governments in carrying out their responsibilities to aid citizens. Congress's intention was to encourage states and localities to develop comprehensive disaster preparedness plans, prepare for better intergovernmental coordination in the face of a disaster, encourage the use of insurance coverage, and provide federal assistance programs for losses due to a disaster.

The Stafford Act is a 1988 amended version of the Disaster Relief Act of 1974. It created the system in place today by which a presidential disaster declaration or an emergency declaration triggers financial and physical assistance through the Federal Emergency Management Agency (FEMA). The Act gives FEMA the responsibility for coordinating government-wide relief efforts. The Federal Response Plan includes contributions from 28 federal agencies and non-governmental organizations, such as the American Red Cross. It is named for Vermont Sen. Robert Stafford (in Senate 1971–89), who helped pass the law.

Congress amended it by passing the Disaster Mitigation Act of 2000, in 2006 with the Pets Evacuation and Transportation Standards Act, and again in 2018 with the Disaster Recovery Reform Act (DRRA).

== Titles ==
=== Title I: Findings, Declarations and Definitions ===
Title I provides the intent of Congress to ensure continued and orderly assistance from the federal government to state and local governments to relieve hardship and damage that result from disasters. As defined by Title I, an emergency is "any occasion or instance for which, in the determination of the President, Federal assistance is needed to supplement State and local efforts and capabilities to save lives and to protect property and public health and safety, or to lessen or avert the threat of a catastrophe in any part of the United States A major disaster is defined as any natural catastrophe, fire, flood, or explosion, determined by the president to warrant the additional resources of the federal government to alleviate damages or suffering they cause".

=== Title II: Disaster Preparedness and Mitigation Assistance ===
Title II authorizes the President to establish a disaster preparedness program that utilizes the appropriate agencies and gives the President the right to provide technical assistance to states in order to complete a comprehensive plan to prepare against disasters. The President can also administer grants to states to provide funding for the preparation and revitalization of emergency plans.

Title II articulates the necessity of a disaster warning system. This includes the readiness of all appropriate federal agencies to issue warnings to state and local authorities and the disbursement of warnings to the public. This title authorizes the President to make use of either the civil defense communication system or any commercial communications systems that are voluntarily given to the president to issue warnings to the public.

Predisaster hazard mitigation plans were also detailed in Title II. Under this title, the President can establish a program to provide financial assistance to states through the National Predisaster Mitigation Fund. States can then develop a mitigation plan that can lessen the impact of a disaster on the public health, infrastructure, and economy of the community. The President can also establish a federal interagency task force to implement predisaster mitigation plans administered by the federal government. The director of the Federal Emergency Management Agency (FEMA) serves as the chairperson of the task force. Other members of the task force include relevant federal agencies, state and local organizations, and the American Red Cross.

=== Title III: Major Disaster and Emergency Assistance Administration ===
Title III, Section 302 explains that upon the declaration of a major disaster or emergency, the President must appoint a federal coordinating officer to help in the affected area. This coordinating officer helps make initial appraisals of the types of relief most needed, establishes field offices, and coordinates the administration of relief among the state, localities, and nonprofits. According to Section 303, the President must also form emergency support teams staffed with federal personnel. These support teams are sent to affected areas to help the federal coordinating officer carry out his or her responsibilities. The President also helps with the establishment of regional support teams. Section 304 also explains the reimbursement process for expenditures by federal agencies under the Act.

Section 305 states the federal government is not liable for any claims based on "the exercise or performance of or the failure to exercise or perform a discretionary function or duty on the part of Federal agency or an employee of the Federal Government in carrying out the provisions of this Act". In general, the expenditure of federal funds for debris clearance, reconstruction, or other emergency assistance which is carried out by contract with private organizations or firms is given to those organizations and firms already residing in or doing business in the affected area (Section 307).

Title III, Section 308 explains the government's nondiscrimination requirements. The President has the right to issue and alter regulations affecting the guidance of personnel carrying out federal assistance in affected areas. These regulations include provisions for ensuring that the distribution of supplies, processing of applications, and other relief activities are accomplished in the fair and impartial way without discrimination on the grounds of color, race, nationality, sex, religion, age, disability, economic status, or English proficiency. It also explains that no geographic areas can be precluded from federal assistance by any type of scale based on income or population.

Section 312 explains Duplication of Benefits (DoB), the rule that anyone who receives disaster assistance for a specific loss cannot receive Federal funding for that same specific loss.

Penalties are set forth in Section 314 of this title. Any person who misuses the funds obtained under the Act may be fined up to one and one-half times the amount that they misused. The Attorney General may also bring a civil action for relief. Any individual who knowingly violates any part of this Act can be subject to a civil penalty of no more than $5,000 per violation.

The last portion of Title III, Section 322, sets forth the requirements of mitigation plans. Each plan developed by a local or tribal government must both describe actions to mitigate hazards and risks identified under the plan and it must establish a strategy to implement those actions. State plans must do four things. The first is to describe the actions to mitigate hazards and risks identified under the plan. Then it must show a way to support the development of a local mitigation plan. The plan must then show how it will provide technical assistance to its local and tribal governments for mitigation plans. Lastly, it must identify and prioritize the mitigation actions that it will support as its resources become available. The President must allow for sufficient public notice and time for public comment (Section 325) before implementing any new or modified policy under this Act that governs the implementation of any public assistance program or that could result in a major reduction of assistance under the public assistance program.

The President shall appoint a Small State and Rural Advocate whose main responsibility is to ensure the fair treatment of small states and rural communities in the provision of assistance under the Act (Section 326). The advocate may also help small states prepare requests for emergency declarations.

=== Title IV: Major Disaster Assistance Programs ===
The procedures for declaring a major disaster are to be made by the governor of the state. When a disaster occurs, the governor executes the state's emergency plan. If the Governor then decides that the disaster is of such severity that the state and affected local governments cannot possibly handle the effects of the disaster, the Governor will make a request to the President explaining the amount of resources they currently have available and commit to the cost-sharing requirements in the Stafford Act. The President can then declare a major disaster or emergency in the affected area.

Title IV sets out the authority of the President during major disasters or emergencies. The president has many powers under this act. These powers include, but are limited to: directing any federal agency to help the affected area (including precautionary evacuations), coordinating all disaster relief assistance, providing technical and advisory assistance (issuing warnings, providing for the public health and safety, and participating in recovery activities), distributing medicine, food and other supplies, and providing accelerating federal assistance when the President deems it necessary. Lastly, the President can also provide any emergency communications or public transportation that an affected location might need. The federal share of these types of assistance is no less than 75 percent of the eligible costs. The President has the ability to contribute up to 75 percent of the cost of any state or local hazard mitigation effort that is deemed as cost-effective and substantially reducing the risk of a major disaster.

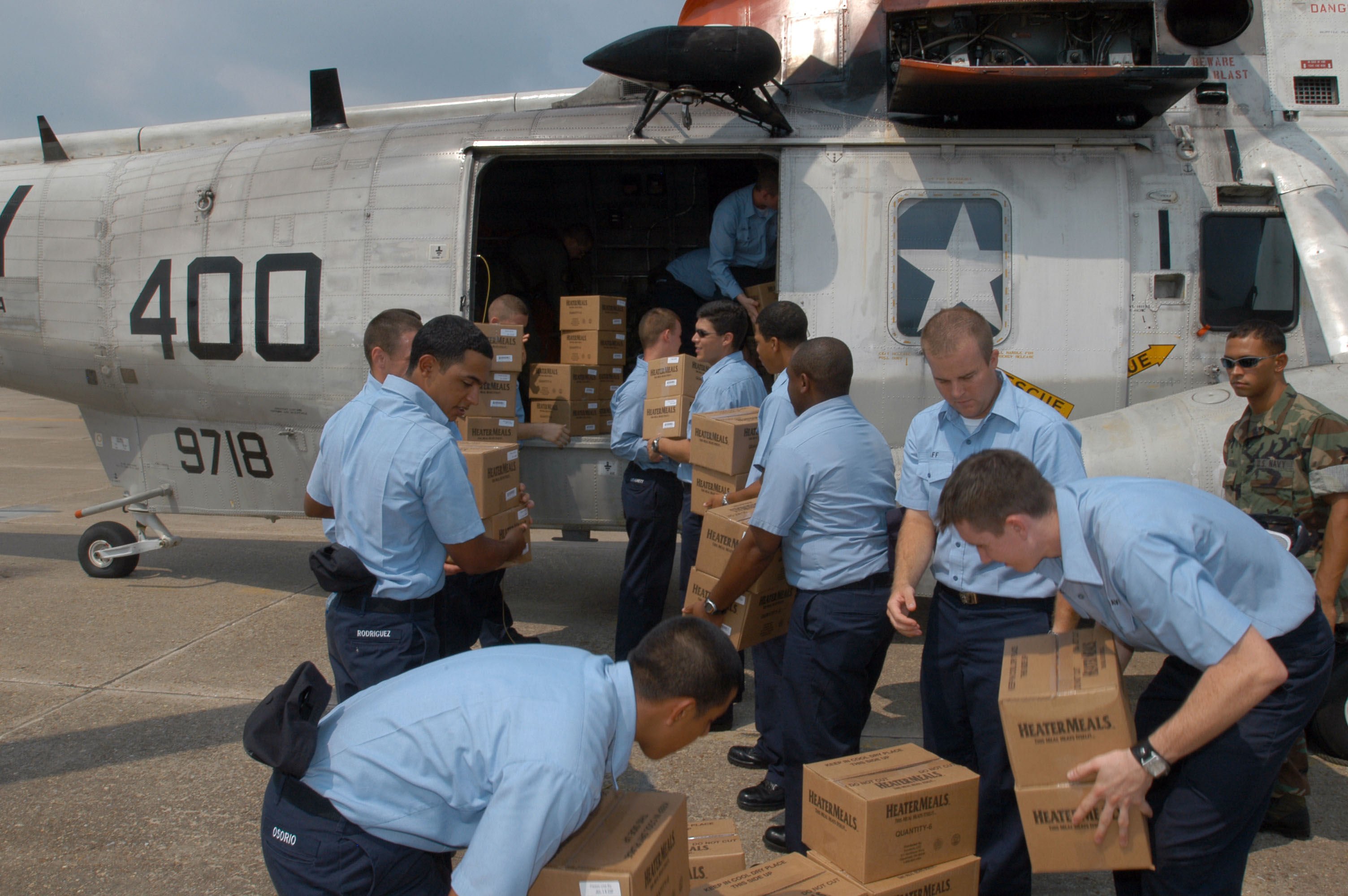
U.S. Navy sailors stationed at Naval Air Station Pensacola load supplies on a UH-3H helicopter before it is transported to New Orleans to aid in disaster relief efforts for the Hurricane Katrina victims.

During a major disaster the Governor may request that the President direct the Secretary of Defense to use the resources of the United States Department of Defense for the purposes of any emergency work. This work is only allowed to be carried out for 10 days. Emergency work is defined as "clearance and removal of debris and wreckage and temporary restoration of essential public facilities and services". Title IV also provides a framework for many essential governmental functions during an emergency including legal services, relocation assistance, distribution of food coupons and unemployment assistance.

If, during an emergency, a local government has lost such a substantial amount of revenues that they cannot perform essential government responsibilities, the President is authorized to provide Community Disaster Loans. The loan amounts are based on need and cannot exceed either (1) 25 percent of the annual operating budget of that local government for the fiscal year in which the disaster occurs and not exceeding $5,000,000, or (2) if the loss of tax and other revenues of the local government as a result of the disaster is at least 75 percent of the annual operating budget of the local government for that fiscal year, 50 percent of the annual operating budget of that local government for the fiscal year in which the disaster occurs, not exceeding $5,000,000.

The federal government will not have the authority to impede the access of an essential service provider to an area impacted by a major disaster. A major service provider is defined as either: a telecommunications service, electrical services, natural gas, water and sewer services, or, is a municipal entity, nonprofit entity, or private entity that is responding to the disaster.

Types of housing assistance are identified under this title. The President can provide financial assistance to be used for individuals wishing to rent alternate housing during a time of emergency. The President may also provide temporary housing units directly to the displaced citizens affected by a major disaster. This type of assistance ends after the 18-month period beginning on the date the President declares the major disaster. The President does have the authority to extend the period if they deem it necessary. The President may also provide funds for the repair or replacement of owner-occupied housing damaged by a major disaster. The federal share of the costs eligible for housing assistance is 100 percent.

=== Title V: Emergency Assistance Programs ===
Title V explains the process a state must follow to request that the President declare an emergency. Every request for the President to declare an emergency must come from the governor of the state. In order for a request to be made, the Governor must deem that the situation is beyond the potential for the state to manage. To do this, the Governor must begin execution of the state's emergency plan and detail the types and amount of federal aid that will be required. Upon receiving this information the President can then decide if the situation qualifies as an emergency. The President does have the authority to declare an emergency without the Governor's request if the President determines that the emergency falls within the primary responsibility of the United States exclusive or preeminent responsibility as governed by the United States Constitution or laws.

The specific abilities of the President are also explained in this Title. The President can direct any federal agency to use its resources to aid the state or local government in emergency assistance efforts. The President also has the responsibility to coordinate all disaster relief assistance and assist with the distribution of food, medicine and other vital supplies to the affected public. The President can provide assistance with debris removal and provide any needed emergency assistance. This Title also gives the President the authority to provide accelerated federal assistance when it has not yet been requested.

The federal share of the costs of such efforts is to be no less than 75 percent of the eligible costs. Total assistance under this Act for one emergency is to be limited to no more than $5 million, except when the President determines additional funds are needed. If additional funds are needed, the President must report to Congress on the extent of the additional need.

=== Title VI: Emergency Preparedness ===
Title VI explains the measures that have to be undertaken to prepare for anticipated hazards including creating operational plans, recruiting and training personnel, conducting research, stockpiling necessary materials and supplies, creating suitable warning systems, and constructing shelters. During a hazard, governments are expected to evacuate personnel to shelter areas, control traffic and panic, and control use of civil communications. After a hazard has occurred, governments must provide services such as fire fighting, rescue, emergency medical, health and sanitation. They must also remove debris and repair or restore essential facilities.

Title VI also sets out the authority and responsibilities of the director of FEMA. The director may prepare and direct federal plans and programs for U.S. emergency preparedness. The director should also delegate emergency responsibilities to federal agencies and state and local governments. Conducting research and training is another responsibility of the director of FEMA. Research should address issues such as shelter design, effective design of facilities and the standardization of those designs, and plans that acknowledge the needs of individuals with pets and service animals during an emergency. Training should be provided for emergency preparedness officials and other organizations who participate in emergency situations.

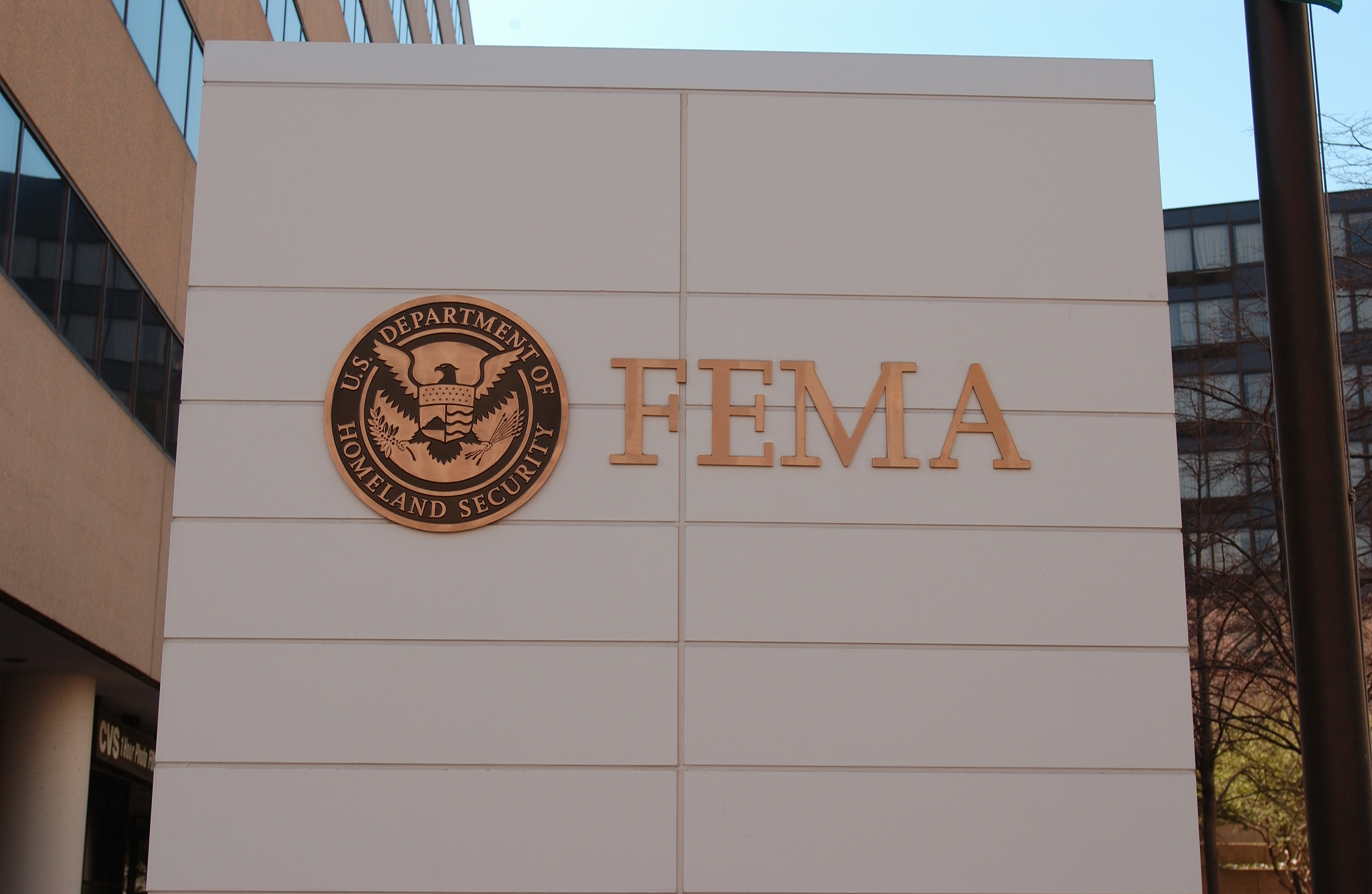
FEMA – Photograph by Bill Koplitz, April 5, 2005, Washington, DC

One responsibility of the FEMA director is to oversee the development and follow through of emergency preparedness compacts, otherwise known as Emergency Management Assistance Compacts (EMACs). "The Emergency Management Assistance Compact (EMAC) is an interstate mutual aid agreement that was developed out of the need to assist and coordinate resources across states in the event of a disaster situation." These compacts strive to deliver materials and services quickly to affected areas during an emergency. These plans must be submitted to the Senate and House of Representatives.

The FEMA director has the ability to give financial contributions to the states for emergency preparedness purposes. These purposes typically include construction, leasing, and renovating of materials and facilities. The amount contributed by the director must be equally matched by the state from any source it finds is consistent with its laws. Any contribution given to a state for shelters or other protective facilities is determined by taking the total amount of funds available to the FEMA director for these facilities in a fiscal year and apportioning it among the states in a ratio. "The ratio which the urban population of the critical target areas (as determined by the Director) in each state, at the time of the determination, bears to the total urban population of the critical target areas of all of the States." The states must also equally match these funds. If they cannot, the director may reallocate the funds to another state. The director must also report to Congress at least once a year regarding all the financial contributions made for emergency preparedness.

Title VI then explains the requirements for an emergency preparedness plan. The plan must be in effect in all political subdivisions of the state. It must also be mandatory and supervised by a single state agency. The plan must make known that the state must share financial responsibility with the federal government from any source it has determined is consistent with its state laws. It must also provide for the creation of a state and local emergency preparedness plan and the employment of a full-time emergency preparedness director or deputy director by the state. An emergency preparedness plan must also make available to the director of FEMA and the Comptroller General any records, books, or papers necessary to conduct an audit. Lastly, a plan must include a way to provide emergency preparedness information to the public (included limited English speakers and those with disabilities) in an organized manner.

The last portion of Title VI addresses security regulations. No FEMA employee is allowed to be in a position of critical importance, as defined by the director of FEMA, until a full field investigation of the employee is completed. Every federal employee of FEMA acting under the authority of Title VI, except those in the United Kingdom or Canada, must complete a loyalty oath as follows:

"I______, do solemnly swear (or affirm) that I will support and defend the Constitution of the United States against all enemies, foreign and domestic; that I will bear true faith and allegiance to the same; that I take this obligation freely, without any mental reservation or purpose of evasion; and that I will well and faithfully discharge the duties upon which I am about to enter.

"And I do further swear (or affirm) that I do not advocate, nor am I a member or an affiliate of any organization, group, or combination of persons that advocates the overthrow of the Government of the United States by force or violence; and that during such time as I am a member of ________ (name of emergency preparedness organization), I will not advocate nor become a member or an affiliate of any organization, group, or combination of persons that advocates the overthrow of the Government of the United States by force or violence."

=== Title VII: Miscellaneous ===
Title VII gives the President the authority to determine any rule or regulation that may be necessary to carry out the powers that he is given in the Act. This can be either through a federal agency, or any other means the President sees fit.

Payment deadlines were also established under this Title. Payment of any approved assistance is to be distributed within 60 days of the approval. Any donation, bequest, or gift received under the subsection is to be deposited into a separate fund on the books of the United States Department of the Treasury. Disaster grant closeout procedures under this Title explain that there should be no administrative action in an attempt to recover any payments made to state or local governments for emergency assistance under the Act until three years after the final expenditure report has been transmitted for that emergency.

Firearm policies prohibit the confiscation of firearms for any reason other than failure to comply with federal law or as evidence in an investigation. It also prohibits the forced registration of a firearm for which registration is not required by any federal, state, or local law. The Title also lays out the rights and legal framework for citizens who feel their gun rights have been violated during a time of emergency.

The Act also dictates that, in matters of disasters, the federal government is to treat Puerto Rico as a state.

== Amendments ==
=== The Disaster Recovery Reform Act of 2018 (DRRA) ===
Inadequate disaster preparation and response motivated the 2018 DRRA, which significantly amended the Stafford Act. Mainly, it expanded eligibility for hazard mitigation funding by allowing the President to contribute up to 75% of the cost of hazard mitigation measures that they determine to be cost effective and increasing resilience, and to set aside funding for pre-disaster mitigation from the Disaster Relief Fund. It also expanded eligibility for both recipients and providers of disaster relief funds in certain areas.

== Criticism ==
There are diffuse criticisms of the Stafford Act. The Institute for Southern Studies has stated that the Act needs to give greater latitude to FEMA on how it responds to disasters that are extraordinarily devastating such as Hurricane Katrina. This is especially true for FEMA's ability to provide financial assistance in the form of grants to states and localities suffering after such a disaster. The Institute for Southern Studies has also noted the red tape that has been associated with the Stafford Act in the Hurricane Katrina recovery efforts. In an article for Frontline, many others agreed that the process of handing out aid was hindered by bureaucratic red tape. This leads to a rather slow response from Washington to diagnose and resolve issues with recovery efforts.

Returning buildings to exact pre-disaster conditions was the basis of a criticism by the authors of the Frontline article. Including the provision in the Stafford Act that requires buildings that are destroyed to be rebuilt the same way that they were standing before the disaster occurred. For example, if a 50-year-old hospital was destroyed during a disaster, the Stafford Act would require the building to be constructed exactly how it was without any updates to the building. This was remedied by the 2018 DRRA.

Other criticisms of the Stafford Act focus on human rights issues that are present during emergencies and recovery efforts. The Stafford Act does not require that the federal government ensure displaced persons have the ability to participate in governmental decisions that affect the recovery efforts. This includes not only access to public forums about recovery planning and management, but the Stafford Act also does not address voting rights or civic participation issues for those who are displaced during a disaster.

Some argue that while the Stafford Act allows the government to provide housing and medical assistance, it does not require it to do so. Any housing, education, or healthcare provided during an emergency and the recovery efforts are provided at the sole discretion of the federal government. Even the rebuilding of medical facilities is discretionary.

While the Stafford Act gives instructions about the needs of the disabled and animals during an emergency, it does not specify any requirements for children or the elderly. These groups may have extenuating circumstances that could prevent them from following the same emergency protocol as an average adult.

== Relevant court cases ==
- La Union del Pueblo Entero v. Federal Emergency Management Agency
- Davis v. United States
- Freeman v. United States
- Saint Tammany Parish v. Federal Emergency Management Agency
- McCue v. City of New York
- Davidson v. Veneman
- Hawaii v. Federal Emergency Management Agency
- Cougar Business Owners Association v. Washington State

== Proposed amendments ==
One proposed amendment to the Stafford Disaster Relief and Emergency Assistance Act is the Federal Disaster Assistance Nonprofit Fairness Act of 2013 (H.R. 592), a bill that passed in the U.S. House of Representatives on February 13, 2013, during the 113th United States Congress. The bill would make religious organizations and religious non-profits eligible to receive federal funding for repairs and rebuilding of their facilities after a major disaster. The bill passed the House by a large margin, but was criticized by opponents for using taxpayer money to help tax-exempt organizations and for violating the principle of separation of church and state.

== In popular culture ==
In 2015, the Stafford Act was used in an episode of House of Cards as a way for President Frank Underwood to fund his signature jobs program, AmericaWorks. In the episode, Underwood used Stafford Act funds under a Title V declaration of emergency for the District of Columbia, citing high unemployment as a disaster in the District. Under Title V of the Act, the president may make an emergency declaration on behalf of an area that is under Federal jurisdiction, which includes Washington, DC. He directed FEMA and other cabinet departments to use the Stafford Funds for jobs programs in the District.
