= Disaster Mitigation Act of 2000 =

- Other short titles: Disaster Mitigation and Cost Reduction Act of 1999
- Long title: To amend the Robert T. Stafford Disaster Relief and Emergency Assistance Act to authorize a program for predisaster mitigation, to streamline the administration of disaster relief, to control the Federal costs of disaster assistance, and for other purposes.
- Acronyms (colloquial): DMA2K
- Enacted by: the 106th United States Congress

Citations
- Public law: Pub. L. 106–390 (text) (PDF)
- Statutes at Large: 114 Stat. 1552

Codification
- Acts amended: Robert T. Stafford Disaster Relief and Emergency Assistance Act
- Titles amended: Title 42 of the United States Code: The Public Health and Welfare

Legislative history
- Introduced in the House as H.R. 707 by Rep. Tillie Fowler (R–FL) on February 11, 1999; Committee consideration by House Transportation and Infrastructure; Senate Environment and Public Works; Passed the House on March 4, 1999 (415–2); Passed the Senate on July 19, 2000 (Unanimous consent); Agreed to by the House on October 10, 2000 (Voice vote); Signed into law by President Bill Clinton on October 30, 2000

The Disaster Mitigation Act of 2000 (Pub. L. 106–390 (text) (PDF), also called DMA2K, is U.S. federal legislation passed in 2000 that amended provisions of the United States Code related to disaster relief. The amended provisions are named after Robert Stafford, who led the passage of the Stafford Disaster Relief and Emergency Assistance Act of 1988.

The 2000 act amends Chapter 68 of Title 42 of the United States Code. Its provisions are titled DISASTER RELIEF - THE PUBLIC HEALTH AND WELFARE.

The chapter sets forth declarations and definitions relating to disaster relief and is used as a central document for the activities of the Federal Emergency Management Agency.

== Congressional findings and declarations ==
§ 5121. CONGRESSIONAL FINDINGS AND DECLARATIONS {Sec. 101}

a) The Congress hereby finds and declares that--

1. because disasters often cause loss of life, human suffering, loss of income, and property loss and damage; and
2. because disasters often disrupt the normal functioning of governments and communities, and adversely affect individuals and families with great severity;

special measures, designed to assist the efforts of the affected States in expediting the rendering of aid, assistance, and emergency services, and the reconstruction and rehabilitation of devastated areas, are necessary.

b) It is the intent of the Congress, by this Act, to provide an orderly and continuing means of assistance by the Federal Government to State and local governments in carrying out their responsibilities to alleviate the suffering and damage which result from such disasters by--

1. revising and broadening the scope of existing disaster relief programs;
2. encouraging the development of comprehensive disaster preparedness and assistance plans, programs, capabilities, and organizations by the States and by local governments;
3. achieving greater coordination and responsiveness of disaster preparedness and relief programs;
4. encouraging individuals, States, and local governments to protect themselves by obtaining insurance coverage to supplement or replace governmental assistance;
5. encouraging hazard mitigation measures to reduce losses from disasters, including development of land use and construction regulations; and
6. providing Federal assistance programs for both public and private losses sustained in disasters [.]

(Pub. L. 93-288, title I, § 101, May 22, 1974, 88 Stat. 143; Pub. L. 100-707, title I, § 103(a), Nov. 23, 1988, 102 Stat. 4689.)
