= Title 22 of the United States Code =

U.S. federal statutes on foreign relations

Title 22 of the United States Code outlines the role of foreign relations and intercourse in the United States Code.

- 22 U.S.C. ch. 1—Diplomatic and Consular Service Generally
- 22 U.S.C. ch. 2—Consular Courts
- 22 U.S.C. ch. 3—United States Court for China
- 22 U.S.C. ch. 4—Passports
- 22 U.S.C. ch. 5—Preservation of Friendly Foreign Relations Generally
- 22 U.S.C. ch. 6—Foreign Diplomatic and Consular Officers
- 22 U.S.C. ch. 7—International Bureaus, Congresses, Etc.
- 22 U.S.C. ch. 8—Foreign Service Buildings
- 22 U.S.C. ch. 9—Foreign Wars, War Materials, and Neutrality
- 22 U.S.C. ch. 10—Hemispheral Relations
- 22 U.S.C. ch. 11—Foreign Agents and Propaganda
- 22 U.S.C. ch. 12—Claims Commissions
- 22 U.S.C. ch. 13—Service Courts of Friendly Foreign Forces
- 22 U.S.C. ch. 14—Foreign Service
- 22 U.S.C. ch. 14A—Foreign Service Information Officers Corps
- 22 U.S.C. ch. 15—The Republic of the Philippines
- 22 U.S.C. ch. 16—Greek and Turkish Assistance
- 22 U.S.C. ch. 17—Relief Aid to War-Devastated Countries
- 22 U.S.C. ch. 18—United States Information and Educational Exchange Programs
- 22 U.S.C. ch. 19—Foreign Assistance Program
- 22 U.S.C. ch. 20—Mutual Defense Assistance Program
- 22 U.S.C. ch. 20A—Mutual Defense Assistance Control Program
- 22 U.S.C. ch. 21—Settlement of International Claims
- 22 U.S.C. ch. 21A—Settlement of Investment Disputes
- 22 U.S.C. ch. 22—Mutual Security Assistance
- 22 U.S.C. ch. 23—Protection of Citizens Abroad
- 22 U.S.C. ch. 24—Mutual Security Program
- 22 U.S.C. ch. 24A—Middle East Peace and Stability
- 22 U.S.C. ch. 25—Protection of Vessels on the High Seas and in Territorial Waters of Foreign Countries
- 22 U.S.C. ch. 26—Armed Forces Participation in International Amateur Sports Competitions
- 22 U.S.C. ch. 27—International Cultural Exchange And Trade Fair Participation
- 22 U.S.C. ch. 28—International Atomic Energy Agency Participation
- 22 U.S.C. ch. 29—Cultural, Technical, And Educational Centers
- 22 U.S.C. ch. 29A—Inter-American Cultural and Trade Center
- 22 U.S.C. ch. 30—International Cooperation in Health and Medical Research
- 22 U.S.C. ch. 31—International Travel
- 22 U.S.C. ch. 31A—National Tourism Organization
- 22 U.S.C. ch. 32—Foreign Assistance
- 22 U.S.C. ch. 33—Mutual Educational and Cultural Exchange Program
- 22 U.S.C. ch. 34—The Peace Corps
- 22 U.S.C. ch. 35—Arms Control and Disarmament
- 22 U.S.C. ch. 36—Migration and Refugee Assistance
- 22 U.S.C. ch. 37—Foreign Gifts and Decorations
- 22 U.S.C. ch. 38—Department of State
- 22 U.S.C. ch. 39—Arms Export Control
- 22 U.S.C. ch. 40—International Expositions
- 22 U.S.C. ch. 41—Study Commission Relating to Foreign Policy
- 22 U.S.C. ch. 42—International Economic Policy
- 22 U.S.C. ch. 43—International Broadcasting
- 22 U.S.C. ch. 44—Japan-United States Friendship
- 22 U.S.C. ch. 45—Commission on Security and Cooperation in Europe
- 22 U.S.C. ch. 46—International Investment And Trade In Services Survey
- 22 U.S.C. ch. 46A—Foreign Direct Investment And International Financial Data
- 22 U.S.C. ch. 47—Nuclear Non-Proliferation
- 22 U.S.C. ch. 48—Taiwan Relations
- 22 U.S.C. ch. 49—Support of Peace Treaty Between Egypt and Israel
- 22 U.S.C. ch. 50—Institute for Scientific and Technological Cooperation
- 22 U.S.C. ch. 51—Panama Canal
- 22 U.S.C. ch. 52—Foreign Service
- 22 U.S.C. ch. 53—Authorities Relating to the Regulation of Foreign Missions
- 22 U.S.C. ch. 53A—Disposition of Personal Property Abroad
- 22 U.S.C. ch. 53B—Foreign Relations of the United States Historical Series
- 22 U.S.C. ch. 54—Private Organization Assistance
- 22 U.S.C. ch. 55—Research and Training for Eastern Europe and Independent States of Former Soviet Union
- 22 U.S.C. ch. 56—United States Institute of Peace
- 22 U.S.C. ch. 57—United States Scholarship Program for Developing Countries
- 22 U.S.C. ch. 58—Diplomatic Security
- 22 U.S.C. ch. 59—Fascell Fellowship Program
- 22 U.S.C. ch. 60—Anti-Apartheid Program
- 22 U.S.C. ch. 61—Anti-Terrorism—PLO
- 22 U.S.C. ch. 62—International Financial Policy
- 22 U.S.C. ch. 63—Support for East European Democracy (SEED)
- 22 U.S.C. ch. 64—United States Response to Terrorism Affecting Americans Abroad
- 22 U.S.C. ch. 65—Control and Elimination of Chemical and Biological Weapons
- 22 U.S.C. ch. 66—United States-Hong Kong Policy
- 22 U.S.C. ch. 67—Freedom for Russia and Emerging Eurasian Democracies and Open Markets Support
- 22 U.S.C. ch. 68—Demilitarization of Former Soviet Union
- 22 U.S.C. ch. 68A—Cooperative Threat Reduction with States of Former Soviet Union
- 22 U.S.C. ch. 69—Cuban Democracy
- 22 U.S.C. ch. 69A—Cuban Liberty and Democratic Solidarity (Libertad)
- 22 U.S.C. ch. 70—Mansfield Fellowship Program
- 22 U.S.C. ch. 71—United States International Broadcasting
- 22 U.S.C. ch. 72—Nuclear Proliferation Prevention
- 22 U.S.C. ch. 73—International Religious Freedom
- 22 U.S.C. ch. 74—Foreign Affairs Agencies Consolidation
- 22 U.S.C. ch. 75—Chemical Weapons Convention Implementation
- 22 U.S.C. ch. 76—Assistance to Countries With Large Populations Having HIV/AIDS
- 22 U.S.C. ch. 77—United States-China Relations
- 22 U.S.C. ch. 78—Trafficking Victims Protection
- 22 U.S.C. ch. 79—Trade Sanctions Reform and Export Enhancement
- 22 U.S.C. ch. 80—Diplomatic Telecommunications Service Program Office (DTS-PO)
- 22 U.S.C. ch. 81—International Criminal Court
- 22 U.S.C. ch. 82—Afghanistan Freedom
- 22 U.S.C. ch. 83—United States Leadership Against HIV/AIDS, Tuberculosis, and Malaria
- 22 U.S.C. ch. 84—Millennium Challenge
- 22 U.S.C. ch. 85—North Korean Human Rights
- 22 U.S.C. ch. 86—Climate Change Technology Deployment in Developing Countries
