= Applications of randomness =

Uses of an apparent lack of pattern or predictability in events

Randomness has multiple uses in science, art, statistics, cryptography, gaming, gambling, and other fields. For example, random assignment in randomized controlled trials helps scientists to test hypotheses, and random numbers or pseudorandom numbers help video games such as video poker.

These uses have different levels of requirements, which leads to the use of different methods. Mathematically, there are distinctions between randomization, pseudorandomization, and quasirandomization, as well as between random number generators and pseudorandom number generators. For example, applications in cryptography usually have strict requirements, whereas other uses (such as generating a "quote of the day") can use a looser standard of pseudorandomness.

== Early uses ==
=== Games ===
Unpredictable (by the humans involved) numbers (usually taken to be random numbers) were first investigated in the context of gambling developing, sometimes, pathological forms like apophenia. Multiple randomizing devices such as dice, shuffling playing cards, and roulette wheels, seem to have been developed for use in games of chance. Electronic gambling equipment cannot use these and so theoretical problems are less easy to avoid; methods of creating them are sometimes regulated by governmental gaming commissions.

Modern electronic casino games contain often one or more random number generators which decide the outcome of a trial in the game. Even in modern slot machines, where mechanical reels seem to spin on the screen, the reels are actually spinning for entertainment value only. They eventually stop exactly where the machine's software decided they would stop when the handle was first pulled. It has been alleged that some gaming machines' software is deliberately biased to prevent true randomness, in the interests of maximizing their owners' revenue; the history of biased machines in the gambling industry is the reason government inspectors attempt to supervise the machines—electronic equipment has extended the range of supervision. Some thefts from casinos have used clever modifications of internal software to bias the outcomes of the machines—at least in those which have been discovered. Gambling establishments keep close track of machine payouts in an attempt to detect such alterations.

Random draws are often used to make a decision where no rational or fair basis exists for making a deterministic decision, or to make unpredictable moves.

== Political use ==
=== Athenian democracy ===
Fifth century BC Athenian democracy developed out of a notion of isonomia (equality of political rights), and random selection was a principal way of achieving this fairness. Greek democracy (literally meaning "rule by the people") was actually run by the people: administration was in the hands of committees allotted from the people and regularly changed. Although it may seem strange to those used to modern liberal democracy, the Athenian Greeks considered elections to be essentially undemocratic. This was because citizens chosen on merit or popularity contradicted the democratic equality of all citizenry. In addition, allotment prevented the corrupt practice of buying votes as no one could know who would be selected as a magistrate, or to sit on a jury.

=== Modern politics ===
Allotment, also called sortition, is today used in the selection of jurors in Anglo-Saxon legal systems like the UK and United States. Proposals have been made for its use in government such as a new constitution for Iraq and various proposals for Upper Houses chosen by allotment—see Reform of the House of Lords § Allotment (sortition). Scholars have studied the potential of random selection of personnel in politics and organizations.

== Science ==
Random numbers have uses in physics such as electronic noise studies, engineering, and operations research. Multiple methods of statistical analysis, such as the bootstrap method, require random numbers. Monte Carlo methods in physics and computer science require random numbers.

=== Statistical sampling ===
Statistical practice is based on statistical theory which is, itself, founded on the concept of randomness. A number of elements of statistical practice depend on randomness via random numbers. Where those random numbers fail to be actually random, any subsequent statistical analysis may suffer from systematic bias. Elements of statistical practice that depend on randomness include: choosing a representative sample of the population being examined, disguising the protocol of a study from a participant (see randomized controlled trial) and Monte Carlo simulation.

These applications are useful in auditing (for determining samples - such as invoices) and experimental design (for example in the creation of double-blind trials).

=== Analysis ===
Many experiments in physics rely on a statistical analysis of their output. For example, an experiment might collect X-rays from an astronomical source and then analyze the result for periodic signals. Since random noise can be expected to appear to have faint periodic signals embedded in it, statistical analysis is required to determine the likelihood that a detected signal actually represents a genuine signal. Such analysis methods requires the generation of random numbers. If the statistical method is extremely sensitive to patterns in the data (such as those used to search for binary pulsars), large amounts of data with no recognizable pattern are needed.

=== Simulation ===
In multiple scientific and engineering fields, computer simulations of real phenomena are commonly used. When the real phenomena are affected by unpredictable processes, such as radio noise or day-to-day weather, these processes can be simulated using random or pseudo-random numbers.

Automatic random number generators were first constructed to carry out computer simulation of physical phenomena, notably simulation of neutron transport in nuclear fission.

Pseudo-random numbers are frequently used in simulation of statistical events, a simple example being the outcome of tossing a coin. More complicated situations are simulation of population genetics, or the behaviour of sub-atomic particles. Such simulation methods, often called stochastic methods, have a number of applications in computer simulation of real-world processes.

Some more speculative projects, such as the Global Consciousness Project, monitor fluctuations in the randomness of numbers generated by multiple hardware random number generators in an attempt to predict the scope of an event in near future. The intent is to prove that large-scale events that are about to happen build up a "pressure" which affects the RNGs.

== Cryptography ==
A ubiquitous use of unpredictable random numbers is in cryptography, which underlies most of the schemes which attempt to provide security in modern communications (e.g., confidentiality, authentication, electronic commerce, etc.).

For example, if a user wants to use an encryption algorithm, it is best that they select a random number as the key. The selection must have high entropy (i.e., unpredictability) to any attacker, thus increasing attack difficulty. With keys having low entropy (i.e., relatively easily guessable by attackers), security is likely to be compromised. To illustrate, imagine if a simple 32 bit linear congruential pseudo-random number generator of the type supplied with most programming languages (e.g., as the 'rand' or 'rnd' function) is used as a source of keys. There will only be some four billion possible values produced before the generator repeats itself. A suitably motivated adversary could simply test them all; this is practical as of 2010, using readily available computers. Even if a linear congruential RNG is used with 1000-bit parameters, it is a simple exercise in linear algebra to recover the modulus m, and the constants a and b, where x' = ax +b (mod m), given only five consecutive values. Even if a better random number generator is used, it might be insecure (e.g., the seed might be guessable), producing predictable keys and reducing security to nil. (A vulnerability of this sort was famously discovered in an early release of Netscape Navigator, forcing the authors to quickly find a source of "more random" random numbers.) For these applications, truly random numbers are ideal, and high quality pseudo-random numbers are necessary if truly random numbers, such as coming from a hardware random number generator, are unavailable.

Truly random numbers are absolutely required to be assured of the theoretical security provided by the one-time pad — the only provably unbreakable encryption algorithm. Furthermore, those random sequences cannot be reused and must never become available to any attacker, which implies a continuously operable generator. See Venona for an example of what happens when these requirements are violated when using a one-time pad.

For cryptographic purposes, one normally assumes some upper limit on the work an adversary can do (usually this limit is astronomically sized). If one has a pseudo-random number generator whose output is "sufficiently difficult" to predict, one can generate true random numbers to use as the initial value (i.e., the seed), and then use the pseudo-random number generator to produce numbers for use in cryptographic applications. Such random number generators are called cryptographically secure pseudo-random number generators, and several have been implemented (for example, the /dev/urandom device available on most Unixes, the Yarrow and Fortuna designs, server, and AT&T Bell Laboratories "truerand"). As with all cryptographic software, there are subtle issues beyond those discussed here, so care is certainly indicated in actual practice. In any case, it is sometimes impossible to avoid the need for true (i.e., hardware-based) random number generators.

Since a requirement in cryptography is high entropy, any published random sequence is a poor choice, as are such sequences as the digits in an irrational number such as the φ or even in transcendental numbers such as π, or e. All are available to an enterprising attacker. Put another way, in cryptography, random bit streams need to be not only random, but also secret and hence unpredictable. Public or third-party sources of random values, or random values computed from publicly observable phenomena (weather, sports game results, stock prices), are almost never cryptographically acceptable. Their use may be tempting, but in reality, they permit easier attacks than attacking the cryptography.

Since most cryptographic applications require a few thousand bits at most, slow random number generators serve well—if they are actually random. This use of random generators is important; some informed observers believe every computer should have a way to generate true random numbers.

== Literature, music and art ==
Some aesthetic theories claim to be based on randomness in one way or another. Little testing is done in these situations, and so claims of reliance on and use of randomness are generally poorly based in definite theory and more on an impression of randomness from technical fields.

An example of a need for randomness sometimes occurs in arranging items in an art exhibit. Usually this is avoided by using a theme. As John Cage pointed out, "While there are many ways that sounds might be produced [i.e., in terms of patterns], few are attempted". Similarly, the arrangement of art in exhibits is often deliberately non-random. One case of this was Hitler's attempt to portray modern art in the worst possible light by arranging works in worst possible manner. A case can be made for trying to make art in the worst possible way; i.e., either as anti-art, or as actually random art.

Dadaism, as well as other movements in art and letters, has attempted to accommodate and acknowledge randomness in various ways. Often people mistake order for randomness based on lack of information; e.g., Jackson Pollock's drip paintings, Helen Frankenthaler's abstractions (e.g., "For E.M."). Thus, in some theories of art, all art is random in that it's "just paint and canvas" (the explanation of Frank Stella's work).

Similarly, the "unexpected" ending is part of the nature of interesting literature. An example of this is Denis Diderot's novel Jacques le fataliste (literally: James the Fatalist; sometimes referred to as Jacques the Fatalist or Jacques the Servant and his Master). At one point in the novel, Diderot speaks directly to the reader:

Now I, as the author of this novel might have them set upon by thieves, or I might have them rest by a tree until the rain stops, but in fact they kept on walking and then near night-fall they could see the light of an inn in the distance. [not an exact quote]

Diderot was making the point that the novel (then a recent introduction to European literature) seemed random (in the sense of being invented out of thin air by the author, not in a modern technical sense). See also Eugenio Montale, Theatre of the Absurd.

Randomness in music includes John Cage's chance-derived Music of Changes, stochastic music, aleatoric music, indeterminate music, or generative music.

== Other uses ==
Random numbers are also used in situations where "fairness" is approximated by randomization, such as selecting jurors and military draft lotteries.

Random numbers are often used in parapsychology as a test of precognition.

Other examples include selecting, or generating, a "Random Quote of the Day" for a website, or determining which way a villain might move in a computer game.

Weaker forms of randomness are also closely associated with hash algorithms and in creating amortized searching and sorting algorithms.

== See also ==
- Black swan theory
- Flipism
