= True random number generator =

True random number generator can be either:

- Hardware random number generator that generates unpredictable random numbers using entropy from a physical process
- Non-physical true random number generator that obtains entropy from general system activity without the use of a dedicated hardware source
