= Fortuna (PRNG) =

Pseudorandom number generator

Fortuna is a cryptographically secure pseudorandom number generator (CS-PRNG) devised by Bruce Schneier and Niels Ferguson and published in 2003. It is named after Fortuna, the Roman goddess of chance. FreeBSD uses Fortuna for /dev/random and /dev/urandom is symbolically linked to it since FreeBSD 11. Apple OSes have switched to Fortuna since 2020 Q1.

== Design ==
Fortuna is a family of secure PRNGs; its design leaves some choices open to implementors. It is composed of the following pieces:

- The generator itself, which once seeded will produce an indefinite quantity of pseudo-random data.
- The entropy accumulator, which collects genuinely random data from various sources and uses it to reseed the generator when enough new randomness has arrived.
- The seed file, which stores enough state to enable the computer to start generating random numbers as soon as it has booted.

=== Generator ===
The generator is based on any good block cipher. Practical Cryptography suggests AES, Serpent or Twofish. The basic idea is to run the cipher in counter mode, encrypting successive values of an incrementing counter.

With a 128-bit block cipher, this would produce statistically identifiable deviations from randomness; for instance, generating 2^{64} genuinely random 128-bit blocks would produce on average about one pair of identical blocks, but there are no repeated blocks at all among the first 2^{128} produced by a 128-bit cipher in counter mode. Therefore, the key is changed periodically: no more than 1 MiB of data (2^{16} 128-bit blocks) is generated without a key change. The book points out that block ciphers with a 256-bit (or greater) block size, which did not enjoy much popularity at the time, do not have this statistical problem.

The key is also changed after every data request (however small), so that a future key compromise doesn't endanger previous generator outputs. This property is sometimes described as "Fast Key Erasure" or Forward secrecy.

=== Entropy accumulator ===
The entropy accumulator is designed to be resistant against "injection" attacks, without needing sophisticated (and inevitably unreliable) estimators of entropy. There are several "pools" of entropy; each entropy source distributes its alleged entropy evenly over the pools; and (here is the key idea) on the nth reseeding of the generator, pool k is used only if n is a multiple of 2^{k}. Thus, the kth pool is used only 1/2^{k} of the time. Higher-numbered pools, in other words, (1) contribute to reseedings less frequently but (2) collect a larger amount of entropy between reseedings. Reseeding is performed by hashing the specified entropy pools into the block cipher's key using two iterations of SHA-256.

=== Seeding ===
Unless an attacker is able to control all the sources of alleged entropy flowing into the system (in which case no algorithm can save it from compromise), there will be some k for which the kth pool collects enough entropy between reseedings that a reseeding with that pool ensures security. And that pool will be used at an interval proportional to the amount of entropy in question. Therefore, the system will always recover from an injection attack, and the time it takes to do so is at most a constant factor greater than the theoretical time it could take if we were able to identify which sources of entropy were corrupt and which not.

This conclusion depends on there being enough pools. Fortuna uses 32 pools, and restricts reseeding to happen at most 10 times per second. Running out of pools would then take about 13 years, which Ferguson and Schneier deem long enough for practical purposes. More paranoid implementors, or ones requiring the generation of random data at a colossal rate and correspondingly frequent reseeding, could use a larger number of pools.

== Alternatives ==
Fortuna differs from the earlier Yarrow algorithm family of Schneier, Kelsey and Ferguson mostly in its handling of the entropy accumulator. Yarrow required each source of entropy to be accompanied by a mechanism for estimating the actual entropy supplied, and used only two pools; and its suggested embodiment (called Yarrow-160) used SHA-1 rather than iterated SHA-256.

== Analysis ==
An analysis and a proposed improvement of Fortuna was made in 2014.

== See also ==
- Blum Blum Shub
- CryptGenRandom
- Random number generator attack
