= Yarrow algorithm =

Random number generator

The Yarrow algorithm is a family of cryptographic pseudorandom number generators (CSPRNG) devised by John Kelsey, Bruce Schneier, and Niels Ferguson and published in 1999. The Yarrow algorithm is explicitly unpatented, royalty-free, and open source; no license is required to use it. An improved design from Ferguson and Schneier, Fortuna, is described in their book, Practical Cryptography

Yarrow was used in FreeBSD, but is now superseded by Fortuna. Yarrow was also incorporated in iOS and macOS for their /dev/random devices, but Apple has switched to Fortuna since 2020 Q1.

== Name ==
The name Yarrow alludes to the use of the yarrow plant in the random generating process of I Ching divination. Since the Xia dynasty (c. 2070 to c. 1600 BCE), Chinese have used yarrow stalks for divination. Fortunetellers divide a set of 50 yarrow stalks into piles and use modular arithmetic recursively to generate two bits of random information that have a non-uniform distribution.

== Principles ==
Yarrow's main design principles are: resistance to attacks, easy use by programmers with no cryptography background, and reusability of existing building blocks. The former widely used designs such as ANSI X9.17 and RSAREF 2.0 PRNG have loopholes that provide attack opportunities under some circumstances. Some of them are not designed with real-world attacks in mind. Yarrow also aims to provide easy integration, to enable system designers with little knowledge of PRNG functionality.

== Design ==
=== Components ===
The design of Yarrow consists of four major components: an entropy accumulator, a reseed mechanism, a generation mechanism, and reseed control.

Yarrow accumulates entropy into two pools: the fast pool, which provides frequent reseeds of the key to keep the duration of key compromises as short as possible; the slow pool, which provides rare but conservative reseeds of the key. This makes sure that the reseed is secured even when the entropy estimates are very optimistic.

The reseed mechanism connects the entropy accumulator to the generating mechanism. Reseeding from the fast pool uses the current key and the hash of all inputs to the fast pool since startup to generate a new key; reseeding from the slow pool behaves similarly, except it also uses the hash of all inputs to the slow pool to generate a new key. Both of the reseedings reset the entropy estimation of the fast pool to zero, but the last one also sets the estimation of the slow pool to zero. The reseeding mechanism updates the key constantly, so that even if the key of pool information is known to the attacker before the reseed, they will be unknown to the attacker after the reseed.

The reseed control component is leveraging between frequent reseeding, which is desirable but might allow iterative guessing attacks, and infrequent reseeding, which compromises more information for an attacker who has the key. Yarrow uses the fast pool to reseed whenever the source passes some threshold values, and uses the slow pool to reseed whenever at least two of its sources pass some other threshold value. The specific threshold values are mentioned in the Yarrow-160 section.

=== Design philosophy ===
Yarrow assumes that enough entropy can be accumulated to ensure that the PRNG is in an unpredictable state. The designers accumulate entropy in the purpose of keeping the ability to recover the PRNG even when the key is compromised. Similar design philosophy is taken by RSAREF, DSA and ANSI X9.17 PRNGs.

=== Yarrow-160 ===
The Yarrow uses two important algorithms: a one-way hash function and a block cipher. The specific description and properties are listed in the table below.

| Algorithms | Properties | What Yarrow-160 uses |
|---|---|---|
| Hash function h(x) | One-way; m-bit output size; collision intractable; Given M input values, the |M| selections of output values are uniformly distributed over m-bit values. | SHA-1 hash function |
| Block cipher E() | Resistant to known-plaintext and chosen-plaintext attacks; High statistical performance of outputs when given highly patterned inputs. | Three-key Triple DES |

==== Generation ====
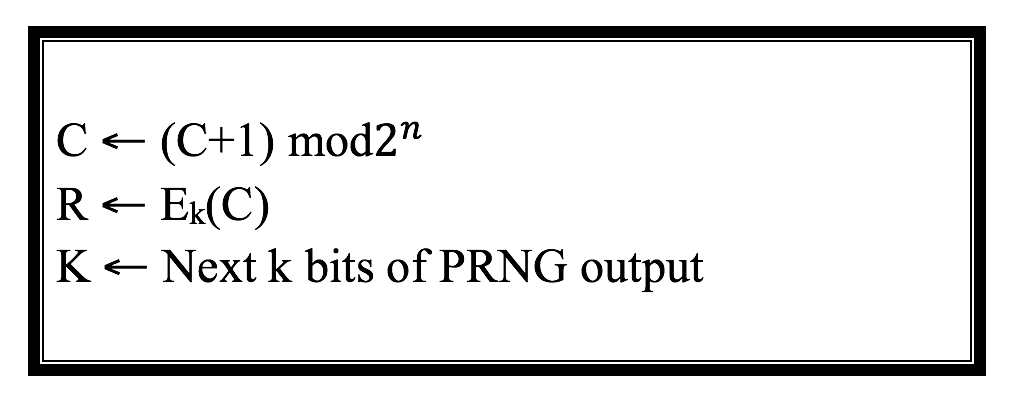
Functions for generation mechanism

Yarrow-160 uses three-key Triple DES in counter mode to generate outputs. C is an n-bit counter value; K is the key. In order to generate the next output block, Yarrow follows the functions shown here.

Yarrow keeps count of the output block, because once the key is compromised, the leak of the old output before the compromised one can be stopped immediately. Once some system security parameter P_{g} is reached, the algorithm will generate k bits of PRNG output and use them as the new key. In Yarrow-160, the system security parameter is set to be 10, which means P_{g} = 10. The parameter is intentionally set to be low to minimize the number of outputs that can be backtracked.

==== Reseed ====
The reseed mechanism of Yarrow-160 uses SHA-1 and Triple DES as the hash function and block cipher. The details steps are in the original paper.

==== Implementation of Yarrow-160 ====
Yarrow-160 has been implemented in Java, and for FreeBSD. The examples can be found in "An implementation of the Yarrow PRNG for FreeBSD" by Mark R. V. Murray.

== Pros and cons of Yarrow ==
=== Pros ===
- Yarrow reuses existing building blocks.
- Compared to previous PRNGs, Yarrow is reasonably efficient.
- Yarrow can be used by programmers with no cryptography background in a reasonably secure way. Yarrow is portable and precisely defined. The interface is simple and clear. These features somewhat decrease the chances of implementation errors.
- Yarrow was created using an attack-oriented design process.
- The entropy estimation of Yarrow is very conservative, thus preventing exhaustive search attacks. It is very common that PRNGs fail in real-world applications due to entropy overestimation and guessable starting points.
- The reseeding process of Yarrow is relatively computationally expensive, thus the cost of attempting to guess the PRNG's key is higher.
- Yarrow uses functions to simplify the management of seed files, thus the files are constantly updated.
- To handle cryptanalytic attacks, Yarrow is designed to be based on a block cipher that is secured. The level of security of the generation mechanism depends on the block cipher.
- Yarrow tries to avoid data-dependent execution paths. This is done to prevent side-channel attacks such as timing attacks and power analysis. This is an improvement compared to earlier PRNGs, for example RSAREF 2.0 PRNG, that will completely fall apart once additional information about the internal operations are no longer secured.
- Yarrow uses cryptographic hash functions to process input samples, and then uses a secure update function to combine the samples with the existing key. This makes sure that the attacker cannot easily manipulate the input samples. PRNGs such as RSAREF 2.0 PRNG do not have the ability to resist this kind of chosen-input attack.
- Unlike ANSI X9.17 PRNG, Yarrow has the ability to recover from a key compromise. This means that even when the key is compromised, the attacker will not be able to predict future outputs forever. This is due to the reseeding mechanism of Yarrow.
- Yarrow has the entropy samples pool separated from the key, and only reseeds the key when the entropy pool content is completely unpredictable. This design prevents iterative guessing attacks, where an attacker with the key guesses the next sample and checks the result by observing the next output.

=== Cons ===
- Yarrow depends on SHA-1, a hash that has been broken (in terms of collision resistance) since Yarrow's publication and is no longer considered secure. However, there is no published attack that uses SHA-1 collisions to undermine Yarrow's randomness.
- Since the outputs of Yarrow are cryptographically derived, the systems that use those outputs can only be as secure as the generation mechanism itself. That means the attacker who can break the generation mechanism will easily break a system that depends on Yarrow's outputs. This problem cannot be solved by increasing entropy accumulation.
- Yarrow requires entropy estimation, which is a very big challenge for implementations. It is hard to be sure how much entropy to collect before using it to reseed the PRNG. This problem is solved by Fortuna, an improvement of Yarrow. Fortuna has 32 pools to collect entropy and removed the entropy estimator completely.
- Yarrow's strength is limited by the size of the key. For example, Yarrow-160 has an effective key size of 160 bits. If the security requires 256 bits, Yarrow-160 is not capable of doing the job.
