= League of Entropy =

Consortium on random number generators

The League of Entropy (LoE) is a voluntary consortium of organizations working together to implement an unpredictable, bias-resistant, fully decentralized, and publicly-verifiable threshold cryptosystem designed to deliver distributed Randomness as a Service, (RaaS) among other use cases. The open-source software that powers the League of Entropy's network is called drand, (short for decentralized randomness).

Active members of the League currently include Arbitrand, Automata Network, ChainSafe, cLabs, Cloudflare, DIA Association, Emerald Onion, École Polytechnique Fédérale de Lausanne (EPFL), Ethereum Foundation, Filecoin Foundation; Gelato Network; IPFS Force, KEN Labs, Kudelski Security, Protocol Labs, PTisp, Quantum Resistant Ledger (QRL) Foundation, Randamu, StorSwift, Tierion, University of Chile, UCL, Tangle Network, and Zama.

The League was inaugurated in 2019 with the original founding members including Cloudflare, Protocol Labs researcher Nicolas Gailly, University of Chile, École Polytechnique Fédérale de Lausanne (EPFL), and Kudelski Security. The League was created to provide a decentralized alternative to centralized randomness beacons where random number generation may be compromised or manipulated, as occurred in the Hot Lotto fraud scandal. It is also intended to avoid the implicit trust assumptions that occur when a single organization or entity is responsible for producing randomness, as in the case of the National Institute of Standards and Technology's public randomness beacon.

Verifiable randomness has numerous applications in blockchain computing, gaming, gambling, lotteries, elections, and privacy-preserving data management systems.
