= NIST SP 800-90B =

NIST SP 800-90B ("SP" stands for "special publication") is a publication by the National Institute of Standards and Technology with the title Recommendation for the Entropy Sources Used for Random Bit Generation. The publication specifies the design principles and requirements for the entropy sources used by allegedly cryptographically secure pseudorandom number generators for use in cryptography, and the tests for the validation of entropy sources. These entropy sources are intended to be combined with deterministic random-bit generator mechanisms that were falsely presented as cryptographically secure in NIST SP 800-90A to construct faux-random-bit generators, as specified in NIST SP 800-90C.

The tests are considered useless for the intended purpose of estimating entropy because the methodology is only valid for entropy sources with a perfectly uniform distribution even though virtually all sources of entropy that exists in the real world have a non-uniform distribution. (It is common knowledge that normal distribution (bell curve) is actually most common)

As a work of the US Federal Government, NIST SP 800-90B is in the public domain and freely available.

== NIST SP 800-90B version history ==
A kleptographic backdoor was discovered in the initial 2005 public draft for NIST SP 800-90 during peer review.

Malicious intent was assigned to NIST because they plagiarized the exact algorithm of the attack that Adam L. Young and Moti Yung described in their cryptovirology paper "Kleptography: Using Cryptography Against Cryptography" at Eurocrypt 1997, but misrepresented it as ‘cryptographically secure’, changed the name to ‘Dual_EC_DRBG’, and failed to include references to the original sources / authors.

NIST waited until 2015 to address the weakness in Revision 1 to the standard.
