= Theatre (disambiguation) =

Theatre or theater refers to representational performing arts, and semantically related to a stage.

It may also refer to:

- Theater (structure), the structural building containing stage and audience seating for performances
- Movie theater, a building used to show films to an audience
- Theatrical troupe, a group of actors or acting company

== Popular culture ==
- Theatre (album), a 1983 album by George Gruntz
- "The Theatre", a song by the Pet Shop Boys on the 1993 album Very
- "Theater" (song), the German entry to the 1980 Eurovision Song Contest
- Theatre (novel), a 1937 novel by W. Somerset Maugham
- Theatre (1928 film), a German silent film
- Theatre (Tamil film), a 2025 Indian Tamil–Malayalam drama
- Theatre: The Myth of Reality, a 2025 Indian Malayalam mystery

== Other uses ==
- Theater (Metro Rail), a rail station in Buffalo, New York
- Theater (warfare), large geographic area where conflict occurs
- Operating theater (or operating room), a room for carrying out surgical operations
- Pejorative term, in the sense of "an act"(pretense): actions taken by an individual or authority to create the impression of doing something useful or valuable, while achieving little. For example:
  - Security Theater, actions carried out by an authority to give the public the impression of security while doing little or nothing to actually achieving it.
  - Hygiene Theater, the practice of taking hygiene measures that are intended to give the illusion of improved safety while doing little to actually reduce any risk.
- ZDFtheaterkanal, a defunct German television channel

== See also ==
- The Theatre, an English playhouse in Shoreditch, London active from 1576, demolished 1598 (timbers used for construction of the original Globe Theatre)
- The Theatre Chipping Norton, Oxfordshire, England
- The Theatre, Leeds, West Yorkshire, England
- Theatre Journal, quarterly academic journal published by the Association for Theatre in Higher Education
- The Theatre (magazine), published in London between 1877 and 1897
- Gaiety Theatre (disambiguation)
