= Counterpane =

Counterpane may refer to:

- Counterpane (bedding)
- BT Counterpane, an information technology company
