= Clara Tott =

German artist (c. 1440 – 1520)

- Born: c. 1440
- Died: 1520
- Spouse: Frederick I, Elector Palatine
- Father: Gerhard Tott

Clara Tott, in other sources Clara Dett, Clara of Dettingen, Tettingen, or Clare Dettin (c. 1440 – 1520), was a court singer associated with the Elector Palatine Frederick I, whom she is said to have secretly married.

== Life ==
Clara Tott was the daughter of Gerhard Tott, who worked for the Augsburg city council. She was employed as a maid to Duchess Anna (1420–1474), the second wife of Duke Albert III of Bavaria. At court in Munich, she worked as a singer.

In 1459, there began a love affair with Frederick I, Elector Palatine. They had two sons, who are described as legitimate in various documents, although it is unclear when, exactly, Clara and Frederick married. Some sources say they married in 1462. In any case, the marriage was secret until 1472, when Frederick, the eldest son, wanted a position in the cathedral chapters of Speyer and Worms and needed to prove his descent unambiguously. In 1470, Elector Philip the Sincere had relieved his uncle Frederick I from his promise not to marry in 1470; nevertheless, for reasons of state the whole situation was kept secret.

After Frederick I died in 1479, his successor Philip even held Clara prisoner at Lindenfels Castle for several years, just to keep the situation secret. Contemporary historians describe the situation vaguely and express themselves very carefully, so as to not displease the powerful Palatinate. Later historians have adopted the unclear terminology of their predecessors, even when the issue became less important dynastically and historically

In the 19th century, the historians Johann Ludwig Klüber and August Wilhelm Heffter researched the issue and wrote a very detailed paper, showing on the basis of clear evidence that both sons had been legitimate and that Clara Tott must have descended from a noble family.

Clara Tott was musically talented and had a lasting effect on the musical life at court in Heidelberg. She assisted her husband when he organized the local choir, and induced him to appoint the famous singer Johann Steinwert von Soest as its leader.

== Legacy ==
A street in Augsburg is named after her.

Max Meyer-Olbersleben composed Clare Dettin, an opera in 3 acts, Op. 41 (1894)

== Issue ==
Clara Tott and Elector Frederick I had a happy marriage. They had two sons:

- Frederick of Bavaria (1460 – 16 October 1474), a canon in the cathedral chapter in Speyer, and later also in Worms. He died before his father and, like his father, he was buried in the Franciscan church in Heidelberg. His epitaph referred to him as an illegitimate son of the elector. The grave stone, with a portrait of Frederick dressed as a cleric, was still in the church in 1716. It was, however, severely damaged by the French.
- Louis of Bavaria (1463-1523). He was raised to imperial count by Emperor Maximilian I on 24 February 1494. His father left him the County of Löwenstein. He was known as Louis of Bavaria and was the founder of House of Löwenstein-Wertheim. His heirs acquired the County of Wertheim and were later raised to princes of the Holy Roman Empire.

Elector Frederick I ruled until his death on behalf of his nephew and adopted son Philip the Sincere. This may have been the reason why he did not arrange a regular share of his inheritance for his two sons with Clara Tott. They would only be entitled to inherit the Electorate of the Palatinate if Philip and his sons would die before they did. If the descendants of Philip were to die out, then the most senior member of the Princely House of Löwenstein-Wertheim would inherit.
