= Snake oil (disambiguation) =

Snake oil is a fraudulent marketing allusion to the selling of fake medicines.

Snake oil may refer to:

- Snake oil (cryptography), a fraudulent cryptographic method
- Snake oil method for generating functions
- Snakeoil (album), a 2012 album by Tim Berne
- Diplo Presents Thomas Wesley, Chapter 1: Snake Oil, a 2020 album by Thomas Wesley
- Snake Oil and Other Preoccupations, a book by John Diamond (2001)
- "Snake Oil", a song by Steve Earle off of the album Copperhead Road (1988)
- Snake Oil (TV series), a reality game show hosted by David Spade and broadcast on Fox
