= Louis I of Löwenstein =

German aristocrat and founder of the House of Löwenstein-Wertheim (1463-1523)

Louis I, Count of Löwenstein
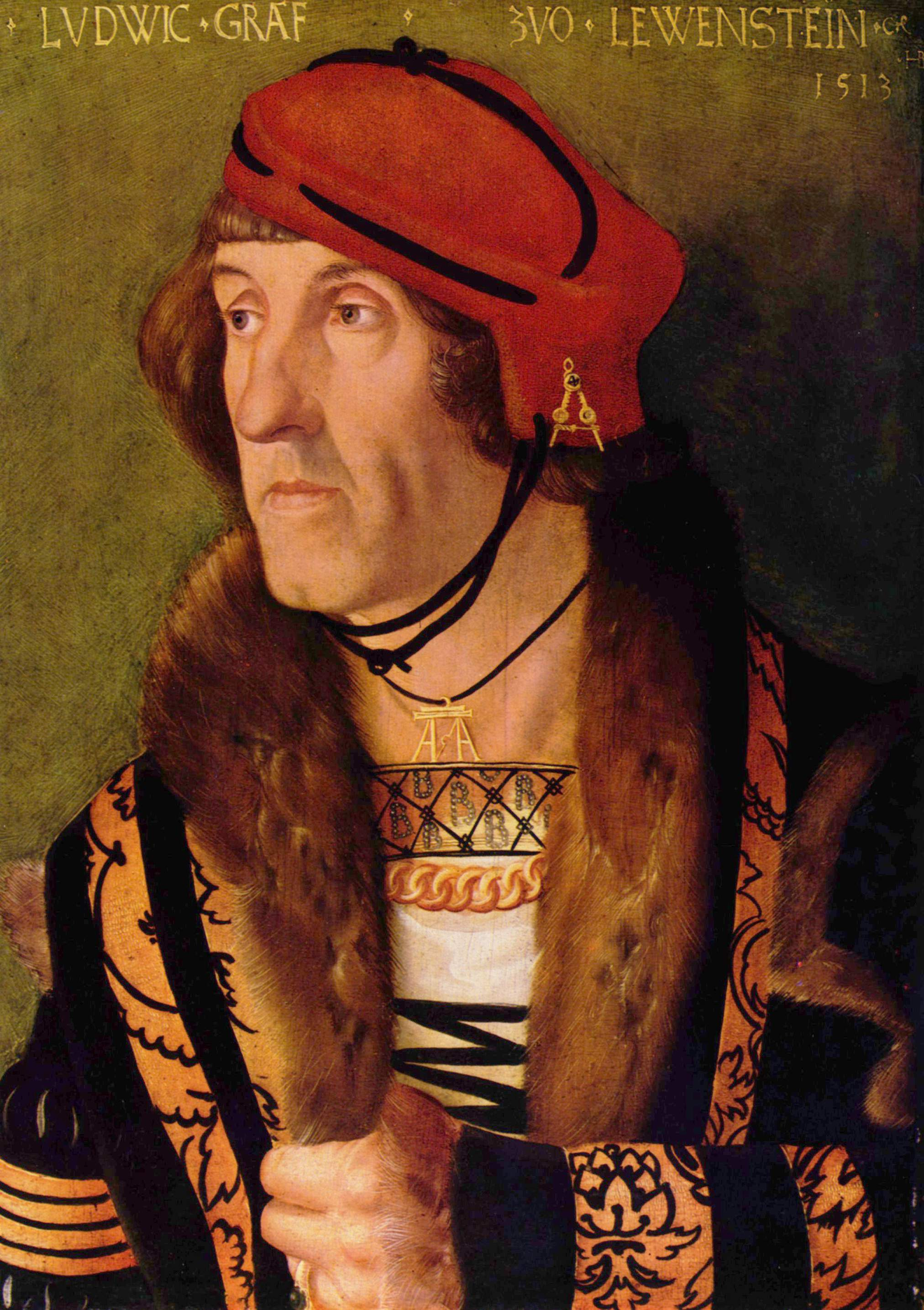
- Louis I, Count of Löwenstein, painted by Hans Baldung, 1513
- Born: 29 September 1463; Heidelberg
- Died: 28 March 1523 (aged 59); Löwenstein
- Noble family: Lowenstein-Wertheim
- Spouses: Elisabeth of Montfort; Sophia Böcklin
- Father: Frederick I, Elector Palatine
- Mother: Clara Tott

Louis I, Count of Löwenstein (29 September 1463 in Heidelberg – 28 March 1523 in Löwenstein) was the founder of the House of Lowenstein-Wertheim.

== Life ==
Louis was a son of the Elector Palatine Frederick I (1425–1476) from his morganatic marriage with Clara Tott. She had been a lady-in-waiting at the court of the Duke of Bavaria in Münich where Frederick met her in 1459. They had two sons, Louis and his elder brother Frederick (1461–1474).

In 1451, Frederick I had adopted his nephew Philip as his son and heir. At the time, he had promised he would not marry himself, so as not to create rival heirs. However, at some point in time, Philip absolved his uncle from this promise and Frederick had secretly married Clara. Frederick continued to support Philip as his heir, and in return Philip promised to provide for Frederick's sons. Philip donated the Lordship of Scharfeneck to Louis, and in 1488, he gave Louis the County of Löwenstein. In 1492, Louis acquired the Lordship of Abstatt, including Wildeck Castle. On 24 February 1484, he was elevated to Imperial Count by Maximilian I, who was King of the Germans at the time.

Louis I is considered the founder of the House of Löwenstein-Wertheim. Two branches of this house exist until this day: the Protestant princes of Löwenstein-Wertheim-Freudenberg and the Catholic princes of Löwenstein-Wertheim-Rosenberg.

== Marriages and issue ==
Louis I married twice. His first wife was Elisabeth of Montfort (d. 13 January 1503), whom he married in 1488. They had ten children:

- Margaret (28 June 1489 – 1489)
- Elisabeth (8 June 1490 – 1530), married:
  1. Count Oswald II of Tierstein (27 August 1474 – 1514):
  2. in 1524 to George Würtwein
- Wolfgang (2 April 1491 – 28 April 1491)
- Louis (b. and d. March 1492)
- Wolfgang (25 March 1493 – 15 April 1512), married on 15 January 1512 to Elisabeth (18 November 1495 – 1540), a daughter of Count Kraft VI of Hohenlohe-Neuenstein
- Catherine (born 25 April 1497 – 10 September 1541), a nun in Lichtenstern Monastery
- Louis II (28 April 1498 – 1536), married on 16 December 1525 to Anna Schenk of Limpurg (d. 1536)
- Clara (28 April 1499 – 6 February 1568), a nun in Lobenfeld Monastery
- Johanna (20 July 1500 – 10 January 1520), a nun in Lichtenstern Monastery
- Frederick I (19 August 1502 – 3 February 1541), married on 16 June 1524 to Helen of Königsegg (15 March 1509 – 20 April 1566); they had a son:
  - Louis III (17 February 1530 – 13 March 1611)

His second wife was Sophia Böcklin (d. 1510). This marriage remained childless.
