= Cryptographie indéchiffrable =

French book on cryptography

- Author: Émile Victor Théodore Myszkowski
- Language: French
- Genre: Factual
- Publication date: 1902

Cryptographie indéchiffrable (English: Indecipherable Cryptography) (subtitle: basée sur de nouvelles combinaisons rationelles (based on new rational combinations)) is a French book on cryptography written by Émile Victor Théodore Myszkowski, a retired French Army colonel, and published in 1902.

His book described a cipher that the author had invented and claimed (incorrectly) was "undecipherable" (i.e. secure against unauthorised attempts to read it). It was based on a form of repeated-key transposition.

== See also ==
- Books on cryptography
- Transposition cipher
- List of ciphers
