= Gaiety =

Gaiety or Gayety may refer to:

- Gaiety (mood), the state of being happy
- Gaiety Theatre (disambiguation)
- USS Gayety (AM-239), former name of the ship BRP Magat Salamat (PS-20)
- The quality of being gay
