= Click Here to Kill Everybody =

2018 non-fiction book by Bruce Schneier

Click Here to Kill Everybody: Security and Survival in a Hyper-connected World
- Author: Bruce Schneier
- Language: English
- Genre: Technology, Security
- Publisher: W. W. Norton Company
- Publication date: 2018
- Publication place: United States
- ISBN: 978-0393608885

Click Here to Kill Everybody: Security and Survival in a Hyper-connected World is a 2018 nonfiction book by Bruce Schneier that explores the risks and security implications of the proliferation of Internet of Things devices and increases in widespread automation, and lays out suggestions as to how these might be best mitigated at a societal level.

The book was praised for its lucid diagnosis of root causes of the widespread security flaws affecting IoT devices, and its "host of modest, plausible, and effective changes we can make to how we regulate [...] tech."
