= Gaiety Theatre =

Gaiety Theatre or Gayety Theatre, and variations may refer to:

== Asia ==
- Gaiety Theater (Manila) (1935), Philippines
- Gaiety Theatre, Shimla (opened 1887), Shimla, India
- Gaiety Theatre, Yokohama (1870–1923), destroyed in the 1923 Kanto earthquake, Japan

== Australia ==
- Gaiety Theatre, Melbourne (1880–1930), Australia
- Gaiety Theatre, Sydney (1880–1900), Australia
- Gaiety Theatre, Zeehan (1898), Tasmania, Australia

== Europe ==
- Gaiety Theatre, Ayr, a theatre in Ayr, Scotland (1871)
- Gaiety Theatre, Dublin, a theatre in Dublin, Ireland (opened 1871)
- Gaiety Theatre, London, a musical theatre in London, UK (1864–1956)
- Gaiety Theatre, Manchester, UK (1884–1957)
- Gaiety Theatre, Isle of Man, an opera house and theatre in Douglas (opened 1900)
- The Glasgow Gaiety Theatre, a cine-theatre in Glasgow, Scotland (1904–1965)
- The Gaiety Theatre, Anglesey Castle, a private theatre at Plas Newydd (Anglesey) in Wales, UK (closed 1905)

== North America ==
=== Canada ===
- Gayety Theatre, Montreal, a 1970s theatre; see Théâtre du Nouveau Monde

=== United States ===
- Gayety Theater, in The Block, Baltimore, Maryland
- Gaiety Theatre (Boston, 1878), Massachusetts
- Gaiety Theatre (Boston, 1908) (1908–1949), Massachusetts
- Gaiety Theatre (male burlesque) (1976–2005), a male burlesque theater in New York, New York
- Embassy Five Theatre, formerly the Gaiety Theatre (1908–1982), a Broadway theater in New York, New York
- Village East by Angelika, formerly the Gayety Theatre, a movie theater in New York, New York
- Gayety Theatre, a burlesque theater in the Sporting District of Omaha, Nebraska, from 1908 to 1928
- Gayety Theater, former name of the Byham Theater in Pittsburgh, Pennsylvania
- Gayety Theater, Washington, D.C. (1907-1959); see William H. McElfatrick § Works

== See also ==
- Gaiety (disambiguation)
- Theatre (disambiguation)
- Gaiety Cinema Group, acquired by Omniplex Cinemas
- Gayety Comedies
