= The Shadow Factory =

2008 nonfiction book by James Bamford

- First edition
- Author: James Bamford
- Language: English
- Subject: National Security Agency, September 11 attacks, war on terror, Iraq War
- Publisher: Doubleday
- Publication date: 2008
- Publication place: United States
- ISBN: 0-385-52132-4
- OCLC: 229309155
- Preceded by: A Pretext for War

The Shadow Factory: The Ultra-Secret NSA from 9/11 to the Eavesdropping on America is a book on the National Security Agency by author James Bamford.

== Fort Gordon, Georgia ==
Bamford's book contains a description of a processing center at NSA's Fort Gordon, Georgia facility, and Operation Highlander, with which it was associated. The staff there analyzed satellite telephone signals (like Inmarsat) from all over the Middle East. They performed various operations such as matching up phone numbers with names of organizations or individuals, recording messages, finding the locations of cellphones, call chaining analysis, language identification and translation, and assigning 'importance' numbers to the "cuts" (recordings).

Bamford's book contains the statements of people who worked there, including Adrienne J. Kinne and John Berry. Berry says that the operation never violated Americans' rights and contributed a good deal to the war effort. Kinne says that they were listening to the phone calls of Americans in the Middle East making calls back to the States, including NGOs, aid workers, and journalists at the Palestine Hotel. Kinne contrasts her years of work before 9/11 in SIGINT and the careful attention paid to USSID 18 with her work after 9/11 and the way USSID 18 was essentially ignored. Kinne later became part of Iraq Veterans Against the War.

The NSA and US Army Intelligence and Security Command (USAINSCOM) Inspectors General investigated her allegations. They found no evidence to support Kinne's allegations of improper intelligence activities. Kinne says the NSA IG never even interviewed her. Both the NSA and Army investigators attempted to conduct interviews with Kinne, but Kinne would not agree to be interviewed. The Congress also questioned the NSA and the Army about the matter.
