= Tann, Hesse =

Tann (Rhön)
- Town
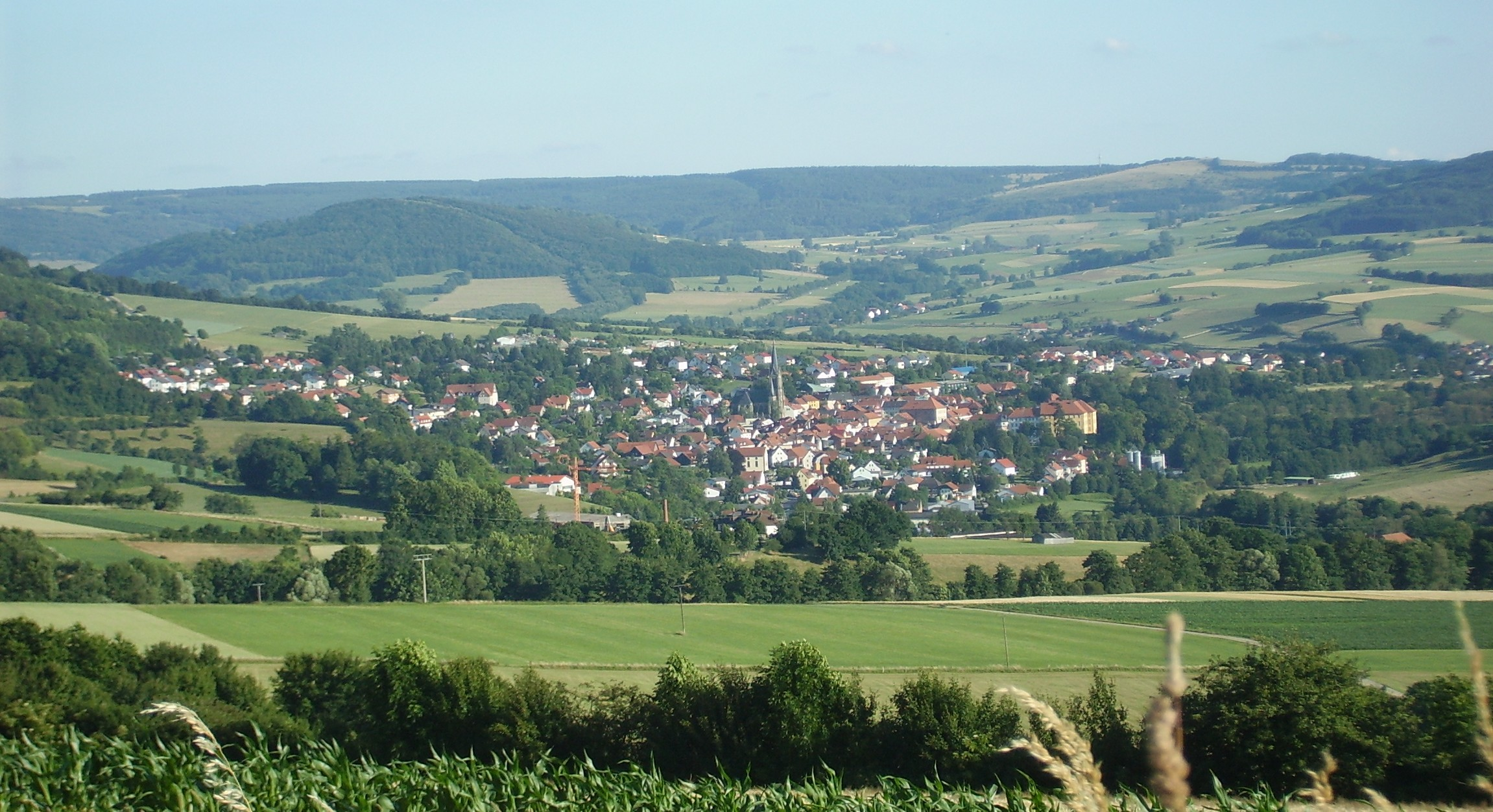
- Landscape of Tann (View from northeast)

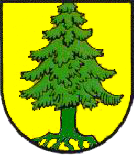
- Coat of arms

- Location of Tann (Rhön) within Fulda district
- Interactive map of Tann (Rhön)
- Location within Germany Location within Hesse
- Coordinates: 50°39′N 10°01′E
- Country: Germany
- State: Hesse
- Admin. region: Kassel
- District: Fulda
- Subdivisions: 10 districts

Government
  - Mayor (2019–25): Mario Dänner (Ind.)

Area
  - Total: 60.45 km^{2} (23.34 sq mi)
- Elevation: 400 m (1,300 ft)

Population (2025-12-31)
  - Total: 4,452
  - Density: 73.65/km^{2} (190.7/sq mi)
- Time zone: UTC+01:00 (CET)
  - Summer (DST): UTC+02:00 (CEST)
- Postal codes: 36142
- Dialling codes: 06682
- Vehicle registration: FD
- Website: www.tann-rhoen.de

Tann (German pronunciation: [tan]) is a town in the district of Fulda, in Hesse, Germany. It is situated in the Rhön Mountains, 27 km northeast of Fulda. It is an accredited Spa town at the Ulster River.

== Mayors ==
- Karl Hilgen (SPD) till 1983
- Wolfgang Schwake (CDU) till 1989
- Dieter Herchenhan] (SPD) till 2001
- Markus Meysner (CDU) till 2013
- Mario Dänner (independent) since 2013

== Buildings ==
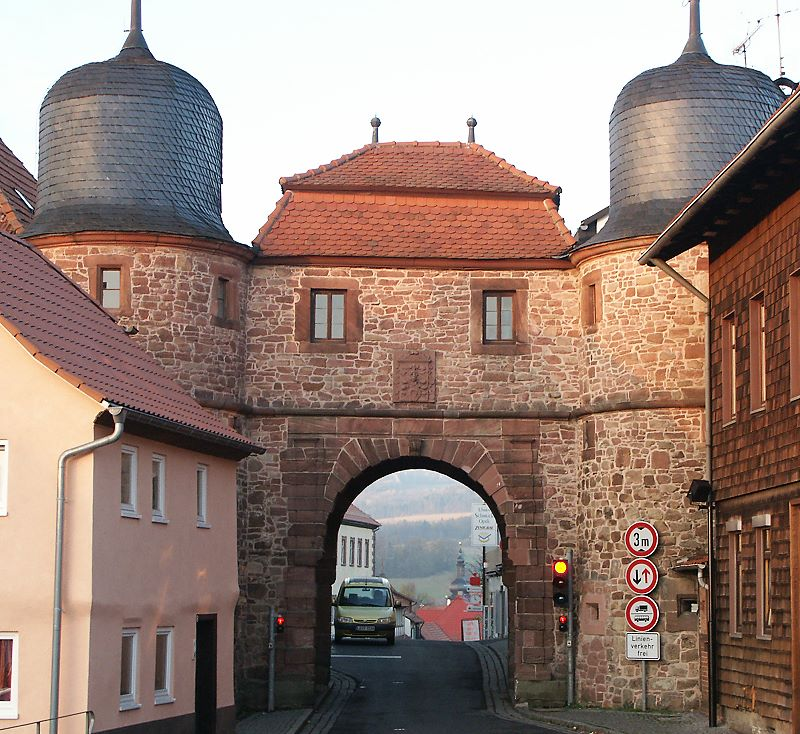
City gate of Tann (built 1557–1563)

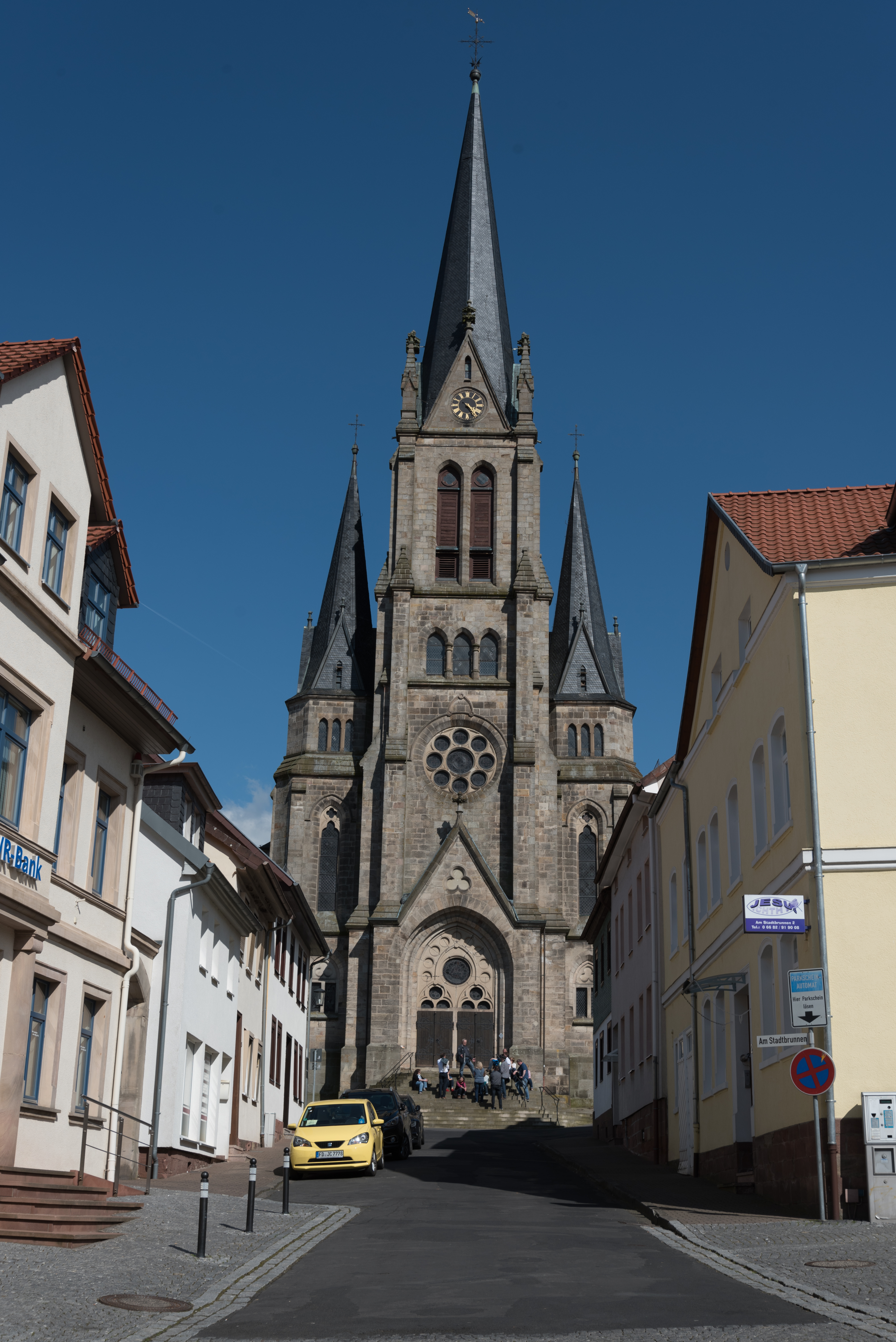
Protestant church

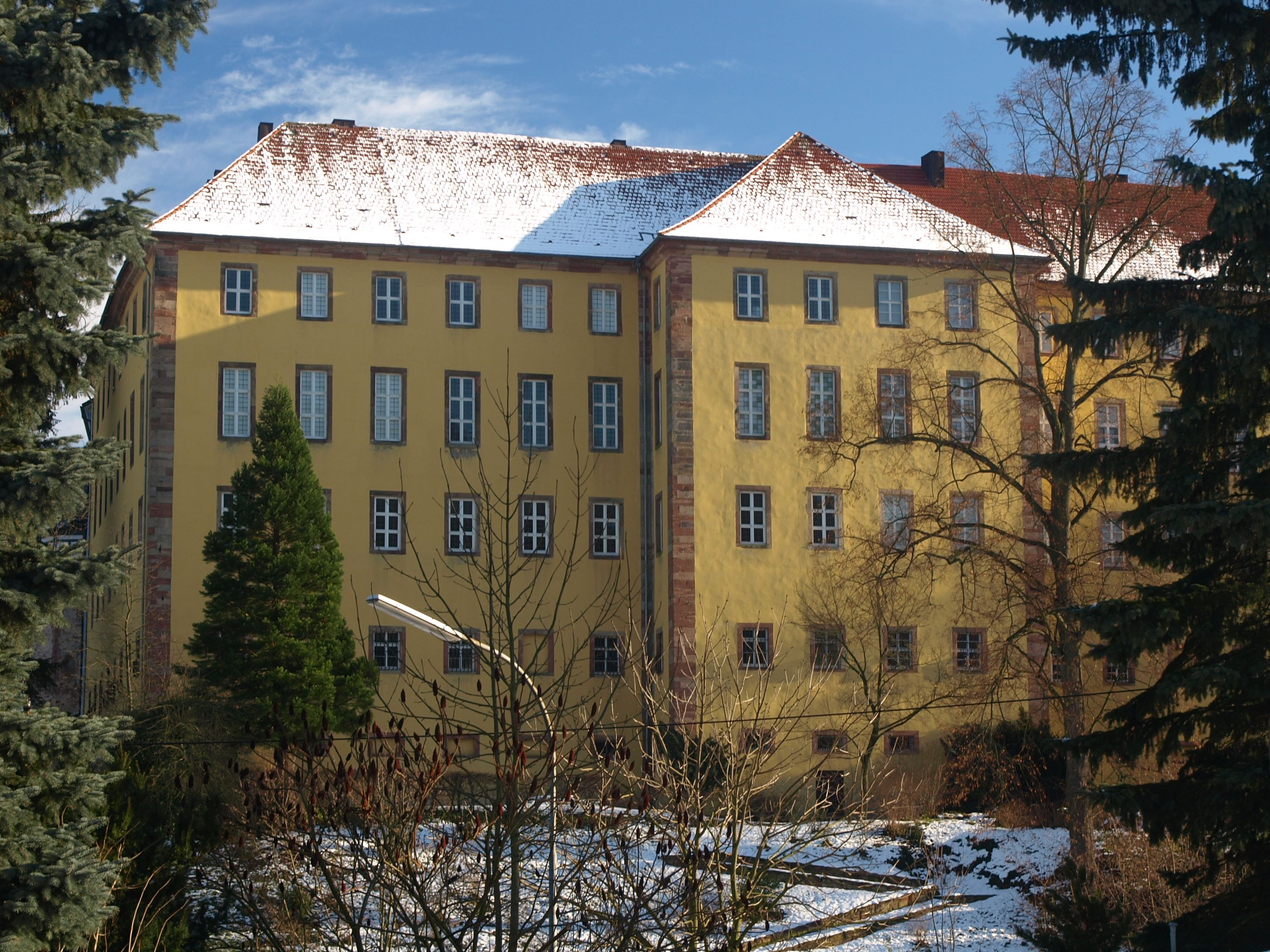
Tann yellow castle

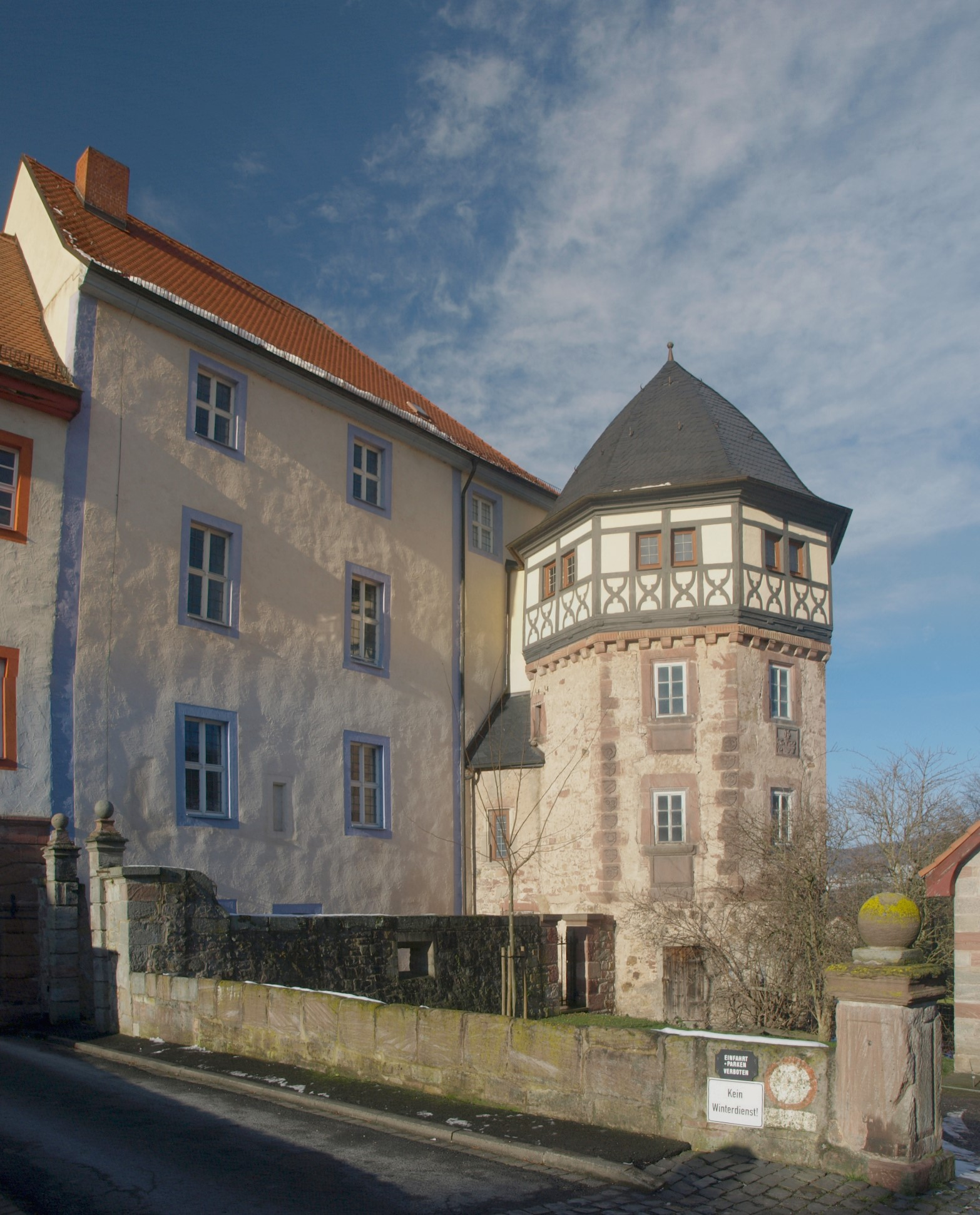
Tann blue castle

== Sons and daughters of the town ==
- Johann Ludwig Klüber (1762-1837), state lawyer and writer

== Personalities who have worked on the spot ==
- Johann Michael Bach (musician at Wuppertal) (1745-1820), a member of the musical Bach family. Worked in Tann as a church musician (1786 to ca. 1795)
- Sebastian Kehl (born 1980, Fulda), grew up in the district Lahrbach, professional football player (Borussia Dortmund
