= A Pretext for War =

2004 book by James Bamford

- First edition
- Author: James Bamford
- Language: English
- Subject: Iraq War
- Publisher: Doubleday
- Publication date: 2004
- Publication place: United States
- ISBN: 978-1-4000-3034-7
- OCLC: 60419496
- Dewey Decimal: 956.7044/31 22
- LC Class: DS79.76 .B36 2005
- Preceded by: Body of Secrets
- Followed by: The Shadow Factory

A Pretext for War: 9/11, Iraq, and the Abuse of America's Intelligence Agencies is a 2004 book by journalist James Bamford that takes a highly critical view of the events around 9/11 and the subsequent Iraq War.

The book is divided into three parts: "Destruction", "Detection", and "Deception".

== Destruction ==
The first part describes in detail the hours before, during, and after the crashing of the two airplanes into the World Trade Center in New York. More importantly, it outlines Bamford's criticism of the performance of America's intelligence agencies in a crisis. The author puts forward the view that the intelligence agencies were not ready because of the lack of smooth technological transition from the Cold War era into modern earth.

== Detection ==
The second part describes and explains what the terrorists were doing prior to, and after the events of 9/11, and how the Intelligence Agencies in America were reacting, and moving about. Bamford argues that the main motive of Al-Qaeda for the destruction of the World Trade Center appears to be in retaliation to the immense support that Israel receives from America, and for America turning its back on the Palestinians.

== Deception ==
The third part focuses on how Bamford feels that the Bush administration and its pro-Israeli neo-conservatives deceived the American public, and the United Nations in order to justify the invasion of Iraq. Removing the Saddam Hussein regime from power in Iraq, and replacing it with a pro-American puppet, would change the map of the Middle East. The events of 9/11, Weapons of Mass Destruction, the accusation of Iraq having near-nuclear capabilities, the ties of Saddam and Al-Qaeda were all based on bogus, or very weak intelligence reports, and exaggeration. The Rendon Group, paid handsomely by the Bush administration, was also allegedly involved in liberally spreading propaganda to the American public to persuade people into believing that Iraq was an imminent threat. This part of the book can be summarized as the abuse of America's intelligence agencies in order to fabricate a pretext for the war in Iraq, and achieve political goals on behalf of America and the Israeli government in the process.

The third part of the book is heavily backed with personal accounts and stories from personnel within the CIA, NSA and associated groups. One notable remark by an unidentified figure in the CIA exclaimed to his employees that if the President wanted a war, then their jobs were to produce the justification and reasons.

== Critical response ==
Time in 2004 called it "probably the best one-volume companion to the harrowing events in the war on terrorism since 1996", noting the book's scathing criticisms of the CIA. Houston Chronicle thought it was sometimes unfair to the Bush administration, but raised many troubling questions. Washington Report on Middle East Affairs noted its striking "candor" and revelations which would be shocking for many Americans. Michiko Kakutani in the New York Times called it a "damning portrait of the country's intelligence agencies" and said "Bamford's conclusions are alarming, if not unfamiliar".
