= Liars and Outliers =

Liars and Outliers: Enabling the Trust that Society Needs to Thrive
- First edition
- Author: Bruce Schneier
- Language: English
- Genre: Anthropology, Security, Sociology
- Publisher: Wiley
- Publication date: 2012
- Publication place: United States
- Pages: 384
- ISBN: 978-1118143308

Liars and Outliers: Enabling the Trust that Society Needs to Thrive is a 2012 nonfiction book by Bruce Schneier about security in the context of a larger society.

The book covers a wide array of disciplines, from game theory and security to sociology and evolution in its attempt to explain how trust scales from a small village in which people know and trust each other to a global economy where individuals cannot possibly trust every person they must work with, but trust the systems of law and physical security instead.

The book received generally positive reviews for its combination of disparate disciplines and relevance to current events.
