= The Codebreakers =

Book by David Kahn

The Codebreakers – The Story of Secret Writing
- Book cover of the 1996 updated reprint
- Author: David Kahn
- Language: English
- Genre: Factual
- Publication date: 1967, 1996
- ISBN: 0-684-83130-9
- OCLC: 35159231
- Dewey Decimal: 652/.8 20
- LC Class: Z103 .K28 1996

The Codebreakers – The Story of Secret Writing (ISBN 0-684-83130-9) is a book by David Kahn, published in 1967, comprehensively chronicling the history of cryptography from ancient Egypt to the time of its writing. The United States government attempted to have the book altered before publication, and it succeeded in part.

== Overview ==
The Codebreakers is widely regarded as the best account of the history of cryptography up to its publication. William Crowell, the former deputy director of the National Security Agency, was quoted in Newsday magazine: "Before he (Kahn) came along, the best you could do was buy an explanatory book that usually was too technical and terribly dull."

The Puzzle Palace (1982), written by James Bamford, gives a history of the writing and publication of The Codebreakers. Kahn, then a journalist, was contracted to write a book on cryptology in 1961. He began writing it part-time, and then he quit his job to work on it full-time. The book was to include information on the NSA and, according to Bamford, the agency attempted to stop its publication. The NSA considered various options, including writing a negative review of Kahn's work to be published in the press to discredit him.

A committee of the United States Intelligence Board concluded that the book was "a possibly valuable support to foreign COMSEC authorities" and recommended "further low-key actions as possible, but short of legal action, to discourage Mr. Kahn or his prospective publishers". Kahn's publisher, Macmillan and Sons, handed over the manuscript to the government for review without Kahn's permission on 4 March 1966. Kahn and Macmillan eventually agreed to remove some material from the manuscript, particularly concerning the relationship between the NSA and its counterpart in the United Kingdom, GCHQ.

The book finishes with a chapter on SETI. Because of the year of its publication, the book did not cover most of the history concerning the breaking of the German Enigma machine, which became public knowledge during the 1970s. Hence, not much was said of Alan Turing. It also did not cover the advent of strong cryptography in the public domain, beginning with the invention of public key cryptography and the specification of the Data Encryption Standard in the mid-1970s. The book was republished in 1996, and this new edition included an additional chapter briefly covering the events since the original publication.

Bradford Hardie III, an American cryptographer during World War II, contributed insider information, German translations from original documents, and intimate real-time operational explanations to The Codebreakers.

== See also ==
- Books on cryptography: other works which cover the later history in more detail.

== Bibliography ==
- Secret War of Words; The Codebreakers. The Story of Secret Writing. By David Kahn. New York Times Book Review, Jan 7, 1968. pg. BR10
