= Hygiene theater =

Hygiene measures that give the illusion of safety

Hygiene theater is the practice of taking hygiene measures that are intended to give the illusion of improved safety while doing little to actually reduce any risk. During the COVID-19 pandemic, hygiene theater has often been performed by retail businesses in an effort to ease concerns of potential customers, while actually doing little to mitigate the risk of contracting SARS-CoV-2.

== History ==
One of the first written uses of the term was in a March 6, 2020, blog post by Bob Cooney, a recreational virtual reality consultant, in which he said that VR-arcade operators should "practice hygiene theater" for customers as the COVID-19 pandemic began. Even earlier written use was in a listener's comment on April 29, 2020, on radio personality Tom Leykis's website. On July 27, 2020, Derek Thompson, a staff writer for The Atlantic, used the term when referring to hygiene measures being taken during the COVID-19 pandemic that have done little to reduce the spread of COVID-19 and have provided a false sense of security.

Measures taken against COVID-19 that have been referred to as hygiene theater include deep cleaning (aside from in hospitals), temperature checks, plexiglass barriers, and the spraying of disinfectants by humans and robots. Cleaning and disinfection measures have persisted despite widespread recognition that SARS-CoV-2 rarely, if ever, spreads through surface contact.

In the United States, many forms of hygiene theater were still in use in some establishments in June 2021. Organizations such as the Kennedy Center continued to deploy temperature checks, even while acknowledging that the benefits were psychological, not medicinal. However, amidst the general reopening of the US, the specifics of what practices were done were varied enormously, as companies updated rules and continued to adapt to customer behavior.

== See also ==
- Security theater
