= Will Doherty =

American political activist

Stardust William David Blumenfeld Doherty (né Will Doherty) is the former executive director of the Verified Voting Foundation and VerifiedVoting.org and was the originator of the Election Incident Reporting System, used to detect over 40,000 problems with the 2004 U.S. Presidential Election and to ensure that all legally qualified voters would have the opportunity to vote.

A Los Angeles Times article by Ralph Vartabedian reported on November 4, 2004: "'We saw systematic problems throughout the U.S.,' said Will Doherty, executive director of VerifiedVoting.org, a group that is calling for every electronic voting machine to produce a paper trail that can be audited."

Doherty appeared on the Brian Lehrer Show of December 8, 2004 with the following description: "Will Doherty, Executive Director of Verified Voting Foundation, says there were widespread problems with electronic voting, but stops short of claiming fraud."

Doherty previously held position as Online Activist and Media Relations Director of the Electronic Frontier Foundation (EFF).

They founded the Online Policy Group (OPG), a free speech Internet Service Provider (ISP) that initiated a lawsuit against election systems manufacturer Diebold Systems, Inc., to prevent the company's attempt to stifle discussion of an email archive demonstrating flaws with Diebold election equipment and potential problems with use of uncertified portions of Diebold election machines in actual elections.

Doherty and interns from the Online Policy Group and the Electronic Frontier Foundation conducted a study on Internet blocking (or filtering) technology that was later used in an amicus curiae brief before the U.S. Supreme Court in a lawsuit challenging the constitutionality of the Children's Internet Protection Act.

Doherty also served as Director of Online Community Development at the Gay & Lesbian Alliance Against Defamation (GLAAD). Doherty holds an M.B.A. from Golden Gate University and a B.S. in Computer Science and Writing from the Massachusetts Institute of Technology (MIT).
