= Cryptomenysis Patefacta =

Non-fiction book written in 1685 by John Falconer

Cryptomenysis Patefacta, or Art of Secret Information Disclosed Without a Key is a 1685 non-fiction book written by John Falconer, it was only the second text written in English on the topic of cryptography. In 1693 it was republished as Rules for Explaining and Deciphering All Manner of Secret Writing.

The book serves as a guide to various cyphers, including Egyptian hieroglyphs and fingerspelling.
