= Body of Secrets =

Non-fiction work by James Bamford

- Author: James Bamford
- Language: English
- Subject: National Security Agency
- Genre: Non-fiction
- Published: 2001 (Anchor Books)
- Publication place: United States
- ISBN: 978-0-385-49907-1
- OCLC: 44713235
- Dewey Decimal: 327.1273 21
- LC Class: UB256.U6 B36 2001
- Preceded by: The Puzzle Palace
- Followed by: A Pretext for War

Body of Secrets: Anatomy of the Ultra-Secret National Security Agency is a book by James Bamford about the NSA and its operations. It also covers the history of espionage in the United States from uses of the Fulton surface-to-air recovery system to retrieve personnel on Arctic Ocean drift stations to Operation Northwoods, a declassified US military plan that Bamford describes as a "secret and bloody war of terrorism against their own country in order to trick the American public into supporting an ill-conceived war they intended to launch against Cuba."

For the book, NSA director Michael Hayden gave him unprecedented access. In contrast, his previous book, The Puzzle Palace, was almost blocked from publication by the agency.

== USS Liberty incident ==
One of the chapters in Body of Secrets is titled “Blood” and is about the 1967 USS Liberty incident. In this chapter, Bamford details the attack and its immediate aftermath. He dedicates part of this chapter to discussing U.S. Navy Chief Petty Officer Marvin E. Nowicki, a linguist aboard a Navy EC-121 that was flying overhead during the attack. CPO Nowicki had commented that he and another linguist onboard the aircraft had intercepted Israeli communications that seemed to indicate they knew or suspected the ship they were attacking was American.

Bamford posits that the motivation for the Israeli attack on the USS Liberty was to cover-up the Ras Sedr massacre, which occurred the same day as the Liberty attack. Bamford postulates that the Israel Defense Forces grew concerned that the USS Liberty, a signals intelligence collection ship, may have collected evidence of the massacre and was thus attacked in an effort to suppress the evidence.

== Bibliographic data ==
- James Bamford, Body of Secrets: Anatomy of the Ultra-Secret National Security Agency,
  - Doubleday; 1st edition (April 24, 2001) ISBN 978-0-385-49907-1
  - Anchor; Reprint edition (April 30, 2002) ISBN 978-0-385-49908-8
  - Bamford, James (2002), Body of Secrets: How America's NSA & Britain's GCHQ Eavesdrop On The World (New ed.), London: Arrow, ISBN 978-0099427742
