= Security theater =

Security measures that are mostly for show

Security theater is the practice of implementing security measures that are considered to provide the feeling of improved security while doing little or nothing to achieve it.

The term was originally coined by Bruce Schneier for his book Beyond Fear and has since been widely adopted by the media and the public, particularly in discussions surrounding the United States Transportation Security Administration (TSA).

Practices criticized as security theater include airport security measures, stop-and-frisk policies on public transportation, and clear bag policies at sports venues.

== Etymology ==
The term security theater was coined by computer security specialist and writer Bruce Schneier for his book Beyond Fear, but has gained currency in security circles, particularly for describing airport security measures.

Examples of use of the term:

For theater on a grand scale, you can't do better than the audience-participation dramas performed at airports, under the direction of the Transportation Security Administration. [...] The T.S.A.'s profession of outrage is nothing but 'security theater,' Mr. Schneier said, using the phrase he coined in 2003 to describe some of the agency's procedures.

— "Theater of the Absurd at the T.S.A.", The New York Times; December 17, 2006

Airline passengers will be able to bring many types of cigarette lighters on board again starting next month after authorities found that a ban on the devices did little to make flying safer, a newspaper reported Friday. 'Taking lighters away is security theater,' Transportation Security Administration chief Kip Hawley told The (New York) Times in an interview.

— "Report: Plane Lighter Ban to Be Lifted", Associated Press; July 20, 2007

== Examples ==
Some measures which have been called security theater include:

=== Airport security measures ===
Many procedures of the TSA have been criticized as security theater. Specific measures critiqued as security theater include the "patting down the crotches of children, the elderly and even infants as part of the post-9/11 airport security show" and the use of full body scanners, which "are ineffective and can be easily manipulated." Many measures are put in place in reaction to past threats and "are ineffective at actually stopping terrorism, as potential attackers can simply change tactics."

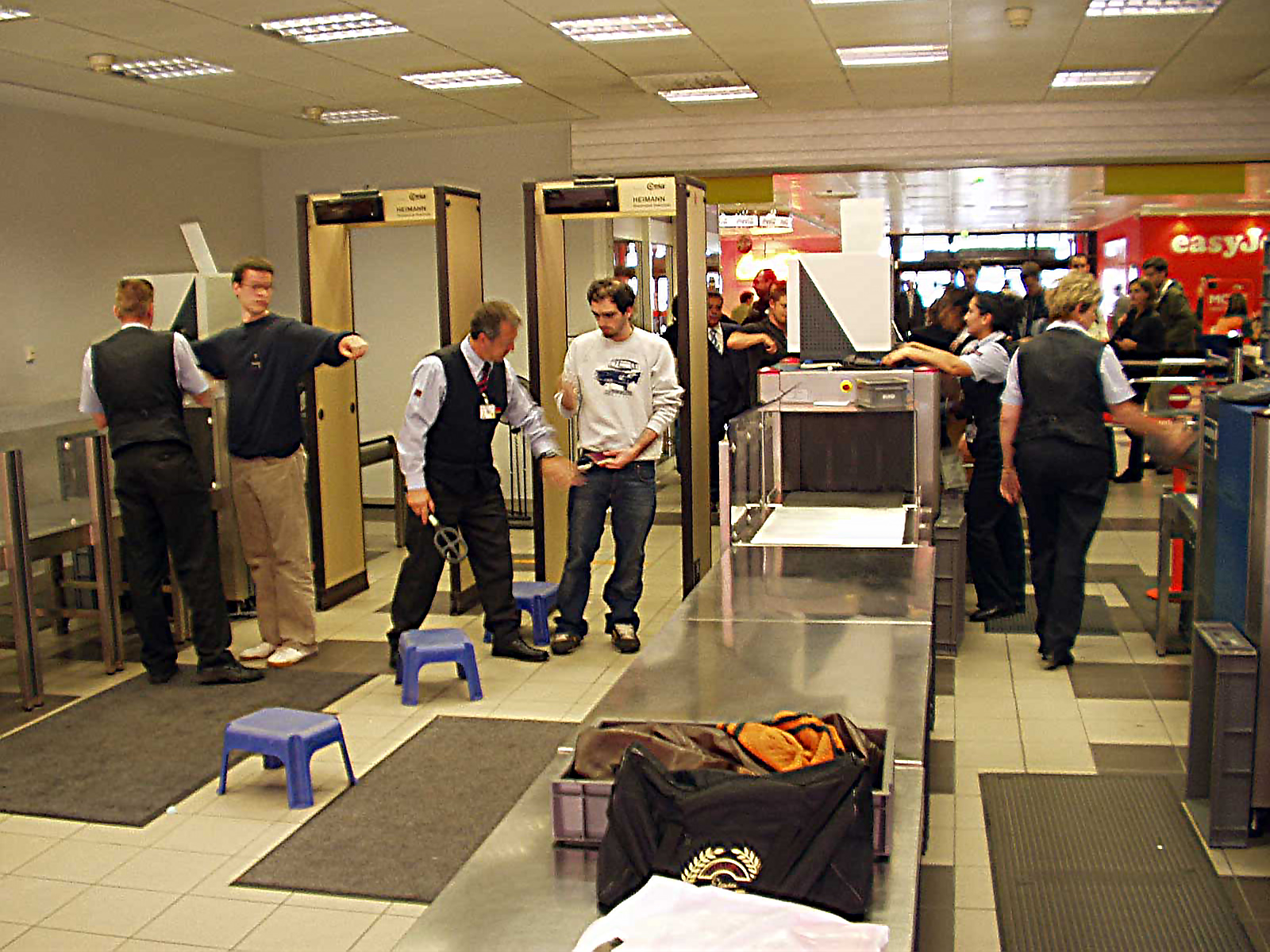
Security Checkpoint at the Berlin-Schönefeld Airport

The use of Computer Assisted Passenger Prescreening System (CAPPS) and its successor, Secure Flight – programs which rely on static screening of airline passenger profiles to choose which people should be searched – has been criticized as ineffective security theater. The TSA's Registered Traveler Program and Trusted Traveler Program have been criticized on similar grounds. CAPPS has been demonstrated to reduce the effectiveness of searching below that of random searches, since terrorists can test the system and use those who are searched least often for their operations.

A 2010 United States Government Accountability Office (GAO) report found that the TSA's $900 million Screening Passengers by Observation Techniques (SPOT) program, a behavioral-detection program introduced in 2007 that is aimed at detecting terrorists, had detected no terrorists and failed to detect at least 16 people who had traveled through airports where the program was in use and were later involved in terrorism cases. In 2013, a GAO report found that no evidence existed to support the idea that "behavioral indicators [...] can be used to identify persons who may pose a risk to aviation security." A separate 2013 report by the Department of Homeland Security Office of Inspector General found that the TSA had failed to evaluate the SPOT program and could not "show that the program is cost effective." The SPOT program has been described as security theater.

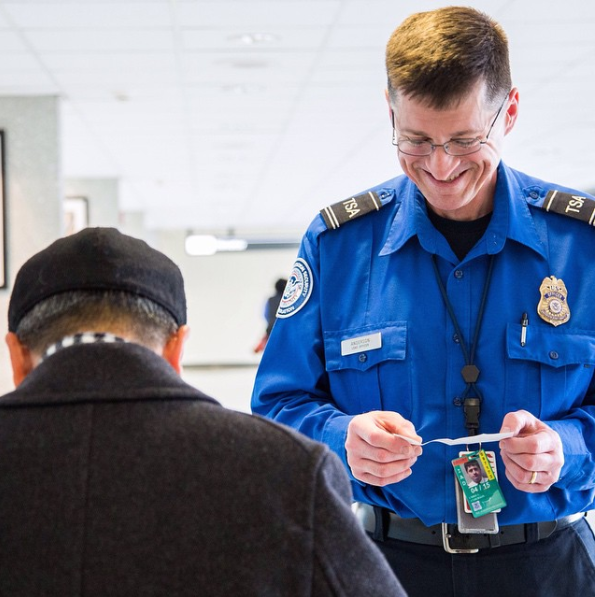
A TSA officer checks a passenger's ID.

With the aim of preventing individuals on the No Fly List from flying on commercial airliners, U.S. airports require all passengers to show valid picture ID (e.g. a passport or driver's license) along with their boarding pass before entering the boarding terminal. At this checkpoint, the name on the ID is matched to that on the boarding pass, but is not recorded. In order to be effective, this practice must assume that 1) the ticket was bought under the passenger's real name (at which point the name was recorded and checked against the No Fly List), 2) the boarding pass shown is real, and 3) the ID shown is real. However, the rise of print-at-home boarding passes, which can be easily forged, allows a potential attacker to buy a ticket under someone else's name, to go into the boarding terminal using a real ID and a fake boarding pass, and then to fly on the ticket that has someone else's name on it. Additionally, a 2007 investigation showed that obviously false IDs could be used when claiming a boarding pass and entering the departures terminal, so a person on the No Fly List can simply travel under a different name.

Facial recognition technology was introduced at Manchester Airport in August 2008. A journalist for The Register claimed that "the gates in Manchester were throwing up so many false results that staff effectively turned them off." Previously matches had to be 80% the same to their passport pictures to go through, and this was quickly changed to 30%. According to Rob Jenkins, a facial recognition expert at Glasgow University, when testing similar machines at a 30% recognition level, the machines were unable to distinguish between the faces of Osama bin Laden and Winona Ryder, bin Laden and Kevin Spacey, nor between Gordon Brown and Mel Gibson.

=== Random search programs on public transit and sports venues ===
Random bag searches on subway systems – a practice that has been used on the Washington Metro and on New York City mass transit – have been condemned as ineffective security theater and a waste of resources. Such programs have also been criticized by members of the public and civil liberties groups. After eighteen months of random bag checks by the Metro Transit Police from December 2010, the Washington Metropolitan Area Transit Authority reported that the program, which was funded by a federal homeland security grant, had yielded zero arrests.

Similarly, the Chicago Transit Authority police's deployment of random explosive-residue-swabbing checkpoints at public transit stations has been criticized as an ineffective means of security. Pat-downs of fans entering arenas for National Football League and metal detectors at Major League Baseball games have also been criticized as security theater. Additionally, the effectiveness of Clear and Large Bag policies at many major sports venues in the United States has been questioned repeatedly.

=== Other ===
During the COVID-19 pandemic, some measures such as surface sanitation and temperature checks at airports have been criticized as being security theater or "hygiene theater".

Credit card signatures have been a longstanding subject of scrutiny and generally referred to as theatrical measure, as they have been notably criticized for having no true effect on deterring or stopping credit card fraud.

== Effects ==
By definition, security theater practices provide no measurable security benefits, or minimal benefits that do not outweigh the cost of such practices. Security theater typically involves restricting or modifying aspects of people's behavior or surroundings in very visible and highly specific ways, which could involve potential restrictions of personal liberty and privacy, ranging from mild inconveniences such as confiscating liquids over a limited amount, to sensitive issues, such as a full body strip search.

Organizations such as the US TSA, who have implemented security theater practices, have been found to be highly ineffective, with one 2015 investigation resulting in TSA agents failing to prevent illegal items in 95% of trials. A follow up study in 2017 found similar results, though the TSA did not release an exact rate of success or failure.

=== Perception ===
Security theater is ineffective at stopping terrorism and crime, but it may be beneficial insofar as it changes the perception of security. If customers or travelers feel more protected and safer as a result of the measures, then they may carry on activities they would have otherwise avoided, which could lead to socioeconomic benefits. Critics such as the American Civil Liberties Union (ACLU) have argued that the benefits of security theater are temporary and illusory since after such security measures inevitably fail, not only is the feeling of insecurity increased, but there is also loss of belief in the competence of those responsible for security.

=== Increased casualties ===
In 2007, researchers at Cornell University studied the specific effects of a change to security practices instituted by the TSA in late 2002. They concluded that this change reduced the number of air travelers by 6%, and estimated that consequently, 129 more people died in car accidents in the fourth quarter of 2002. Extrapolating this rate of fatalities, New York Times contributor Nate Silver remarked that this is equivalent to "four fully loaded Boeing 737s crashing each year."

=== Economic costs ===
The 2007 Cornell University study also noted that strict airport security hurts the airline industry; it was estimated that the 6% reduction in the number of passengers in the fourth quarter of 2002 cost the industry $1.1 billion in lost business.

The ACLU has reported that between October 2008 and June 2010, over 6,500 people traveling to and from the United States had their electronic devices searched at the border. The Association of Corporate Travel Executives (ACTE), whose member companies are responsible for over one million travelers and represent over $300 billion in annual business travel expenditures, reported in February 2008 that 7% of their members had been subject to the seizure of a laptop or other electronic device. Electronic device seizure may have a severe economic and behavioral impact. Entrepreneurs for whom their laptop represents a mobile office can be deprived of their entire business. Fifty percent of the respondents to ACTE's survey indicated that having a laptop seizure could damage a traveler's professional standing within a company.

The executive director of the ACTE testified at a 2008 hearing of the Senate Judiciary Subcommittee on the Constitution seizure of data or computers carrying business proprietary information has forced and will force companies to implement new and expensive internal travel policies.

=== Increased risk of targeted attacks ===
The direct costs of security theater may be lower than that of more elaborate security measures. However, it may divert portions of the budget for effective security measures without resulting in an adequate, measurable gain in security.

Because security theater measures are often so specific (such as concentrating on potential explosives in shoes), it allows potential attackers to divert to other methods of attack. This not only applies to the extremely specific measures, but can also involve possible tactics such as switching from using highly scrutinized airline passengers as attackers to getting attackers employed as airline or airport staff. Another alternate tactic would be simply avoiding attacking aircraft in favor of attacking other areas where sufficient damage would be done, such as check-in counters (as was done, for example, in the attacks on Brussels airport on 22 March 2016), or simply targeting other places where people gather in large numbers, such as cinemas.

=== Discriminatory practices ===
An additional disadvantage of security theater is the potential for biases to lead to negative outcomes and unequal treatment for certain groups. Airport racial profiling in the United States is an issue that largely began in the wake of the September 11 attacks on the United States, and persists today.

Documents uncovered by the ACLU found that until late 2012, the US TSA maintained training manuals that exclusively focused on examples of Arab or Muslim terrorists. In 2022, the US GAO found that advanced imaging technologies by the TSA disproportionately selected passengers of minority groups for additional screening, and a follow up report in 2023 found the same issue.

The ACLU also filed a 2015 lawsuit against the TSA's SPOT program, and was successful in obtaining thousands of pages of documents regarding the program. The ACLU dropped their lawsuit against the TSA in 2017, but a report published by the organization, as well as reports published by the US GAO and a scientific advisory group found that the SPOT program had no scientific basis for effectiveness.

== See also ==
- Christopher Soghoian – creator of a website that generated fake airline boarding passes
- Hygiene theater
- Placebo effect
- Target hardening
- Watching-eye effect
- Dramaturgy (sociology)
