= Kryptographik =

1809 book on cryptography

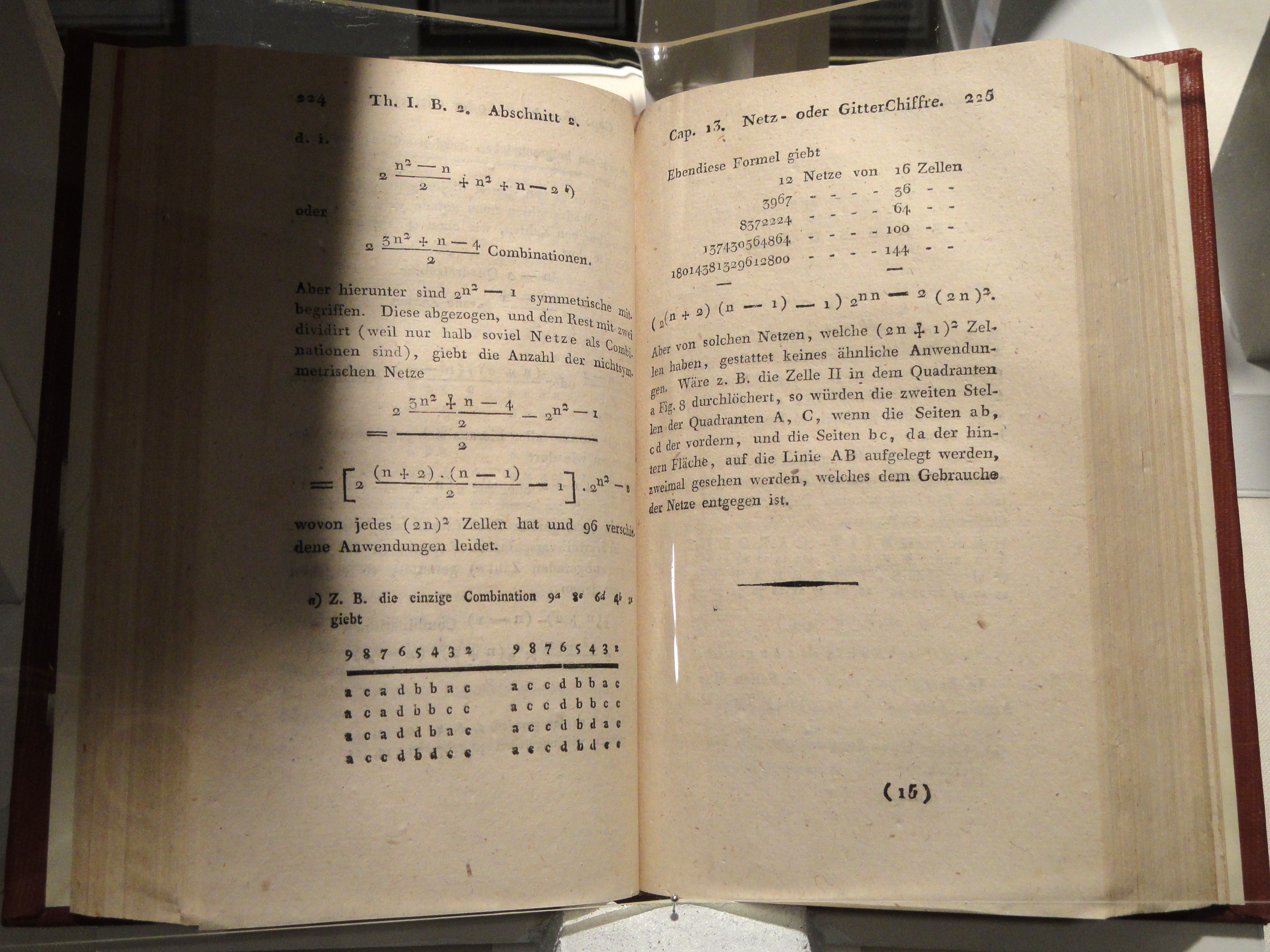
A copy of Kryptographik at the National Cryptologic Museum

Kryptographik Lehrbuch der Geheimschreibekunst (Cryptology: Instruction Book on the Art of Secret Writing) is an 1809 book on cryptography written by Johann Ludwig Klüber.

In 2011 the National Security Agency included a copy of Kryptographik, used by a German cryptographer during World War II, as part of a 50,000-page release of classified documents.
