= BT Managed Security Solutions =

BT Counterpane, formerly Counterpane Internet Security, Inc., was a company that sells managed computer network security services. Counterpane offered a range of managed security services including vulnerability scanning, security device monitoring, incident response, and consulting. Their core offering was Managed Security Monitoring, in which Counterpane analysts proactively monitored and responded to security threats on customer networks remotely and 24/7. This outsourced approach aimed to improve enterprise security operations.

The company was founded by American cryptographer Bruce Schneier in August 1999.

Their "Enterprise Protection Suite" is a service package that includes network scanning, security device management and consulting services based on their "Managed Security Monitoring" service. BT Counterpane is the world's biggest network data security company.

The company was acquired by BT Group on 25 October 2006.
