= Beyond Fear: Thinking Sensibly About Security in an Uncertain World =

2003 book by Bruce Schneier

- First edition cover
- Author: Bruce Schneier
- Language: English
- Genre: Non-fiction
- Publisher: Springer-Verlag
- Publication date: 2003
- ISBN: 0-387-02620-7

Beyond Fear: Thinking Sensibly About Security in an Uncertain World is a non-fiction book by Bruce Schneier, published in 2003. The book grew out of an Atlantic Monthly article by Charles Mann. Beyond Fear presents a five-step process for evaluating the value of a countermeasure against security attacks. The book is divided into three parts. Part one of Beyond Fear introduces the idea that all security involves "trade-offs". Part two: "How Security Works", explains key principles in security such as Attackers, Defenders, Identification, Authentication, and Authorization. Part three: "The Game of Security" ties all the issues together and offers suggestions on how to form a coherent security policy.

This book is about security: how it works and how to think about it. It's not about whether a particular security measure works, but about how to analyze and evaluate security measures.

— Schneier's description of Beyond Fear (ch.1, pg.7)

The book is notable for coining the term "security theater". It has since been widely adopted by the media and the public, particularly in discussions surrounding the United States Transportation Security Administration (TSA).
