= James Bamford =

American author, journalist and documentary producer

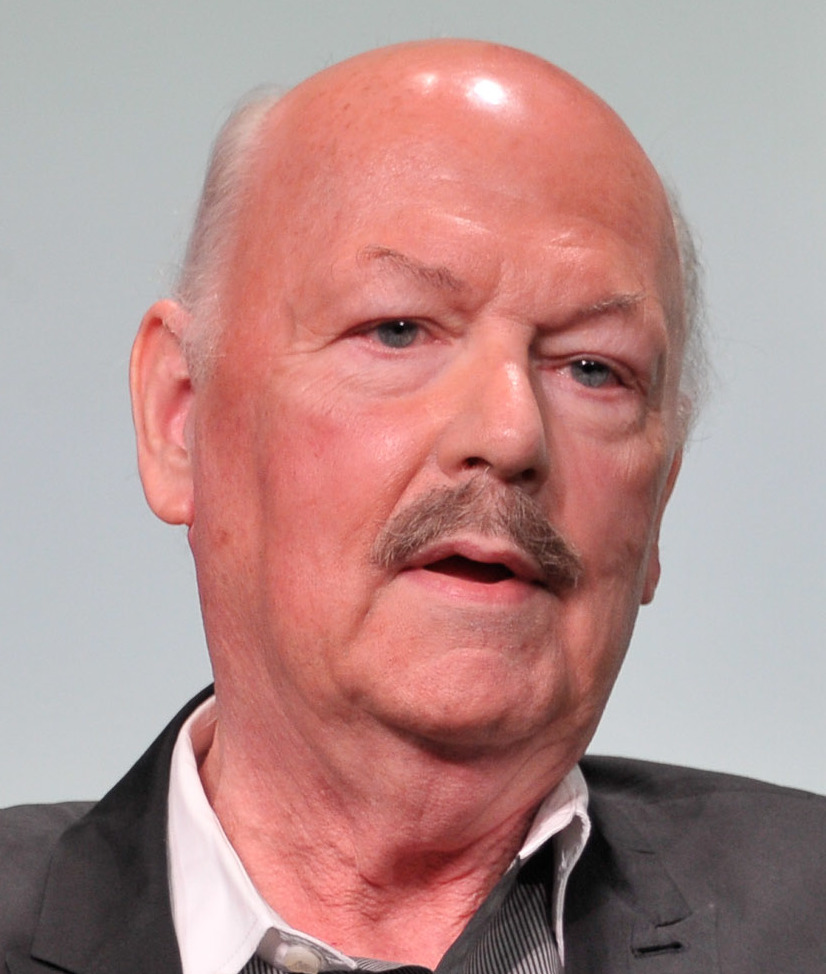
- Born: James Bamford; September 15, 1946 (age 80); Atlantic City, New Jersey, U.S.
- Education: Suffolk University; University of Paris; Yale University
- Occupations: Author, journalist, documentary filmmaker
- Writing career
- Genre: Authority on the United States intelligence agencies
- Notable work: The Puzzle Palace: A Report on America's Most Secret Agency (1982); Body of Secrets: Anatomy of the Ultra-Secret National Security Agency (2001); A Pretext For War: 9/11, Iraq, and the Abuse of America's Intelligence Agencies (2005); The Shadow Factory: The Ultra-Secret NSA from 9/11 to the Eavesdropping on America (2008)
- Notable awards: National Magazine Award for Reporting; Emmy Award Nomination for Outstanding Investigative Journalism; Investigative Reporters and Editors Gold Medal; Overseas Press Club Award for Excellence; Society of Professional Journalists Deadline Award

James Bamford (born September 15, 1946) is an American author, journalist and documentary producer noted for his writing about United States intelligence agencies, especially the National Security Agency (NSA). The New York Times has called him "the nation's premier journalist on the subject of the National Security Agency" and The New Yorker named him "the NSA's chief chronicler."

In 2006, he won the National Magazine Award for Reporting for his writing on the war in Iraq published in Rolling Stone.

In 2015 he became the national security columnist for Foreign Policy magazine and he also writes for The New Republic. His book, The Shadow Factory: The Ultra-Secret NSA From 9/11 to the Eavesdropping on America, became a New York Times bestseller and was named by The Washington Post as one of "The Best Books of the Year."

== Early life ==
Bamford was born on September 15, 1946, in Atlantic City, New Jersey, and raised in Natick, Massachusetts. During the Vietnam War, he spent three years in the United States Navy as an intelligence analyst assigned to a National Security Agency unit in Hawaii. Following the Navy, he earned a Juris Doctor Degree in International Law from Suffolk University Law School in Boston, Massachusetts; a post graduate diploma from the Institute on International and Comparative Law, University of Paris I Panthéon Sorbonne; and was awarded a fellowship at Yale Law School.

While in law school as a Navy reservist, Bamford blew the whistle on the NSA when he learned about a program that involved illegally eavesdropping on US citizens. He testified about the program in a closed hearing before the Church Committee, the congressional investigation that led to sweeping reforms of US intelligence abuses in the 1970s.

== The Puzzle Palace and threat of prosecution ==
In 1982, following graduation, he wrote The Puzzle Palace: A Report on NSA, America's Most Secret Intelligence Agency (Houghton Mifflin) which became a national bestseller and won the top book award from Investigative Reporters and Editors, the professional association of investigative journalists. Washingtonian magazine called it "a monument to investigative journalism" and The New York Times Book Review said, "Mr. Bamford has uncovered everything except the combination to the director's safe."

During the course of writing the book, Bamford discovered that the Justice Department in 1976 began a secret criminal investigation into widespread illegal domestic eavesdropping by the NSA. As a result, he filed a request under the Freedom of Information Act (FOIA) for documents dealing with the investigation and several hundred pages were eventually released to him by the Carter administration. However, when President Ronald Reagan took office, the Justice Department sought to stop publication of the book and demanded return of the documents, claiming they had been "reclassified" as top secret. When Bamford refused, he was threatened with prosecution under the Espionage Act. In response, Bamford cited the presidential executive order on secrecy, which stated that once a document had been declassified it cannot be reclassified. As a result, President Reagan changed the executive order to indicate that once a document has been declassified it can be reclassified. However, due to ex post facto restrictions in the US Constitution, the new executive order could not be applied to Bamford and the information was subsequently published in The Puzzle Palace.

== NSA raid on the Marshall Library ==
Following publication, however, the NSA continued its efforts against Bamford. While writing The Puzzle Palace, the author made extensive use of documents from the George C. Marshall Research Library in Virginia. These included the private correspondence of William F. Friedman, one of the founders of the NSA. Although none of the documents was classified, following the book's release the NSA sent agents to the library to order their removal. The action led to a lawsuit (631 F.Supp. 416 (1986)) by the American Library Association (ALA) against the NSA, charging that the agency had no right to enter a private library and classify and remove Friedman's private papers. Although the court criticized NSA, saying it "does not condone by any means NSA's cavalier attitude toward its classification determination," it nevertheless found in the agency's favor and dismissed the suit. The ALA appealed the dismissal to the U.S. Court of Appeals but Ruth Bader Ginsburg, who was at that time a judge on that court, ruled that the ALA lacked standing in the case. At the library, Bamford also had access to the private papers of Marshall S. Carter, a former director of the NSA whom he had interviewed. But after the book was published, agency officials met with Carter at a secure location in Colorado, where he was in retirement, and threatened him with prosecution if he did not immediately close his collection and refrain from further interviews. Carter reluctantly agreed to the demands.

== Body of Secrets and A Pretext for War ==
In 2001, Bamford released Body of Secrets: Anatomy of the Ultra-Secret NSA, From the Cold War to the Dawn of a New Century (Doubleday). The second in his trilogy, it also became a national bestseller. A cover review in The New York Times Book Review called it "an extraordinary work of investigative journalism" and it won the Investigative Reporters and Editors Gold Medal, the highest award given by the association.

In 2002, during the lead up to the war in Iraq, Bamford argued that there were no weapons of mass destruction in Iraq and therefore the country should not go to war. He made his arguments on the editorial pages of USA Today where he was a member of the newspaper's Board of Contributors. And in 2004 he released A Pretext for War: 9/11, Iraq. and the Abuse of America's Intelligence Agencies (Doubleday), which became a bestseller. Time, in a two-page review, said, "A Pretext for War is probably the best one-volume companion to the harrowing events in the war on terrorism since 1996." The Washington Post listed the book as one of "The Best of 2004" and in a cover review said, "Bamford does a superb job of laying out and tying together threads of the Sept. 11 intelligence failures and their ongoing aftermath." Bamford also wrote on the war in Iraq for Rolling Stone magazine and his 2005 article, "The Man Who Sold the War," won the National Magazine Award for reporting, the highest award in magazine writing, and was included in Columbia University's The Best American Magazine Writing.

== The Shadow Factory and ACLU v. NSA ==
In 2006, following revelations in The New York Times that the NSA had been conducting illegal domestic eavesdropping for decades, Bamford joined writer Christopher Hitchens and several others as plaintiffs in a lawsuit (ACLU v. NSA, 493 F.3d 644) brought by the American Civil Liberties Union that challenged the constitutionality of the agency's surveillance. On August 17, 2006, District Court Judge Anna Diggs Taylor granted summary judgment for Bamford and the other plaintiffs, ruling that the surveillance was unconstitutional and illegal, and ordered that it be halted immediately. However, she stayed her order pending appeal. Later the Sixth Circuit Court of Appeals reversed the District Court ruling on the grounds that the plaintiffs could not show that they had been or would be subjected to surveillance personally, and therefore they lacked standing before the Court.

In 2008, Bamford released the third book in his trilogy, The Shadow Factory: The Ultra-Secret NSA From 9/11 to The Eavesdropping on America, which became a New York Times bestseller and was named by The Washington Post as one of "The Best Books of the Year."

== PBS and ABC News ==
Bamford also writes and produces documentaries for PBS and in 2010 was nominated for an Emmy Award for his program, "The Spy Factory," which was based on his book, The Shadow Factory. Earlier he spent a decade as the Washington investigative producer for ABC's World News Tonight, covering the White House as well as reporting from much of the world, including the Middle East during the Gulf War. Among his awards was the Overseas Press Club Award for Excellence and the Society of Professional Journalists Deadline Award for the Best Investigative Reporting in Television.

== Legal cases ==
Bamford has served as a defense consultant in a number of espionage cases, including U.S. v. Thomas Andrews Drake. A former senior NSA official, in 2011 Drake was charged under the Espionage Act for allegedly leaking classified documents to the Baltimore Sun. However, Bamford was able to show that all the materials the government claimed to be classified were actually freely available in the public domain, and placed there by the government itself. As a result, the government was forced to throw out the charges against Drake in exchange for a misdemeanor plea for abusing his computer, with no jail time or even a fine. It was one of the very few times the government had been forced to dismiss charges in an espionage case.

Additionally, Bamford has testified as an expert witness on intelligence issues before committees of the Senate and House of Representatives as well as the European Parliament in Brussels and the International Criminal Tribunal for the former Yugoslavia. He has also been a guest lecturer at the Central Intelligence Agency's Senior Intelligence Fellows Program, the National Security Agency's National Cryptologic School, the Defense Intelligence Agency's Joint Military Intelligence College, the Pentagon's National Defense University and the Director of National Intelligence's National Counterintelligence Executive. And he has been an invited speaker at colleges and universities in the U.S., Europe, and the Middle East, including Oxford, Harvard, Yale, the American University of Beirut and many others.

During the 2010s, Bamford wrote a number of cover stories for Wired magazine as a contributing editor, including "The Most Wanted Man in the World," the result of three days in Moscow with NSA whistleblower Edward Snowden, the longest any journalist has spent with him there.

== U.S.S. Liberty Advocacy ==
Bamford is a strong supporter of the "USS Liberty Veterans Association" and has written many articles in support of survivors of the 1967 Israeli attack on the USS Liberty. He spoke at a 2004 U.S. State Department symposium that was convened in about the Six-Day War in response to the findings of the 2003 Moorer Commission and the 2004 release of Captain Ward Boston's affidavit pertaining to the USS Liberty incident.

One of the chapters in Body of Secrets is titled "Blood" and is about the Liberty. He dedicates part of this chapter to discussing how U.S. Navy Chief Petty Officer Marvin E. Nowicki, a linguist aboard a Navy EC-121 that was flying overhead during the attack, intercepted Israeli communications that seemed to indicate they knew or suspected the ship they were attacking was American. He goes on to posit that the motivation for the Israeli attack on the Liberty was to cover-up the Ras Sedr massacre, which occurred the same day. He postulates that the Israel Defense Forces attacked the signals intelligence collection ship to destroy any evidence of the massacre that it may have collected.

== Criticisms ==
Jefferson Adams in the International Journal of Intelligence and CounterIntelligence praised Spyfail (2023) but noted that Bamford did not address Cuba and was troubled by Bamford's attention to criticism of Israel, with 4 of the 9 chapters addressing Israel. Tim Weiner, writing in The New Republic, criticized Bamford's omission of what he described as successful US counterintelligence in the CIA's prediction that Russia was about to attack Ukraine. According to the Washington Report on Middle East Affairs, a publication regarded as critical of Israel and US policy, Bamford's book "ruffles all the right feathers" in reference to a negative assessment of the book by the Central Intelligence Agency and praises it for its critical view of Israel's intervention in United States politics.

== Publications ==
=== Books ===
- Bamford, James (1982). The Puzzle Palace: Inside the National Security Agency, America's Most Secret Intelligence Organization. Viking Penguin. ISBN 0-14-006748-5.
- Bamford, James (2001). Body of Secrets: Anatomy of the Ultra-Secret National Security Agency. Doubleday. ISBN 0385499078.
- Bamford, James (2004). A Pretext for War: 9/11, Iraq, and the Abuse of America's Intelligence Agencies. Doubleday. ISBN 0385506724.
- Bamford, James (2008). The Shadow Factory: The Ultra-Secret NSA from 9/11 to the Eavesdropping on America. Doubleday. ISBN 9780385521321.
- Bamford, James (2023). Spyfail: Foreign Spies, Moles, Saboteurs, and the Collapse of America's Counterintelligence. Twelve. ISBN 978-1538741153.

=== Articles ===
Date	Publication	Title
August 9, 1982	Newsday (Viewpoints Section)	"The UN: A Gold Mine for U.S. Intelligence"
November 6, 1982	The Nation	"How I Got the NSA Files . . . How Reagan Tried to Get Them Back"
September 9, 1983	The Boston Globe (Op-Ed Section)	"Victim of the Long Electronic War"
October 1983	Boston Observer	"How We Know What We Know About KAL 007"
December 4, 1983	The Washington Post Magazine	"Big Brother is Listening"
January 8, 1984	The Washington Post Magazine	"The Last Flight of KAL 007: How the U.S. Watches The Soviets in the Far East"
January 22, 1984	The New York Times Book Review	"On the Trail of a Mole"
January 13, 1985	The New York Times Magazine	"America's Supersecret Eyes in Space"
April 21, 1985	Los Angeles Times Book Review	"Black Box: KAL 007 and the Superpowers; KAL Flight 007: The Hidden Story"
June 9, 1985	The Washington Post Book World	"Stansfield Turner and the Secrets of the CIA"
April 6, 1986	The Washington Post Book World	"The Spy Plane That Flew into History"
May 1986 (Naval Review Issue)	Proceedings (U.S. Naval Institute)	"The Walker Spy Case."
May 24, 1986	The Boston Globe (Op-Ed Section)	"U.S. Satellite Photos of Plant Should Have Been Released"
July 6, 1986	Los Angeles Times (Op-Ed Section)	"Searching for Security, Casey Fires at the Press"
July 13, 1986	The New York Times Book Review	"Keeping Intelligence Smart"
August 3, 1986	The New York Times Book Review	"When Ideology Was Thicker Than Money"
September 28, 1986	Los Angeles Times Book Review	"Shootdown, The Target is Destroyed"
October 5, 1986	Los Angeles Times (Op-Ed Section)	"CIA Gets Billing Again in Nicaragua, as Covert Action Becomes the Norm"
November 9, 1986	Los Angeles Times (Op-Ed Section)	"Satellites Show a World of Secrets, to Rival Powers and Now the Press"
January 4, 1987	Los Angeles Times (Op-Ed Section)	"Reagan CIA: Arrogance Instead of Oversight"
January 18, 1987	The New York Times Magazine	"Carlucci and the NSC"
February 8, 1987	Los Angeles Times (Op-Ed Section)	"An Aspirin for the CIA, but Major Surgery Needed"
February 8, 1987	The Washington Post Book World	"Bankrolling International Murder and Extortion"
June 14, 1987	Los Angeles Times (Op-Ed Section)	"Ghosts of CIA Haunt Hearings"
October 11, 1987	Los Angeles Times Magazine	"They Also Serve Who Watch and Listen"
October 18, 1987	The Washington Post Book World	"The Nugan Hand Affair: Banking on Espionage"
October 29, 1987	Los Angeles Times (Op-Ed Section)	"Carlucci: Big Man About Intelligence
February 21, 1988	Los Angeles Times (Op-Ed Section)	"FBI: If It's Under Cover, It May Be Out of Control"
March 6, 1988	Los Angeles Times Magazine	"Taking on the Mob"
May 29, 1988	Los Angeles Times (Op-Ed Section)	"Fighting the Drug War, Congress Opens Door to Intelligence Misdeeds"
Vol. 3, No. 5, May 1988, pp. 38–47	City Magazine	"Taking on the Mob"
June 1988, Vol. 114, No. 6	Proceedings (U.S. Naval Institute)	Review of Merchants of Treason by Thomas B. Allen & Norman Polmar
June 26, 1988	Los Angeles Times (Op-Ed Section)	"Wire Taps, Big Waste, Wild Trips"
July 3, 1988	The Washington Post Book World	"Where Secret Armies Clash By Night"
August 7, 1988	The New York Times Book Review	"A Mole Without Portfolio"
September 9, 1988	The New York Times (Op-Ed Section)	"Reagan's Done Nothing to Stop the Spies"
February 9, 1992	The New York Times Book Review	"Of Cabals and Coups"
January 29, 1995	The New York Times Book Review	"The View From The KGB"
March 3, 1996	Los Angeles Times (Op-Ed Section)	"Has a 30-Year Mystery Unraveled?"
August 20, 1998	The New York Times (Op-Ed Section)	"Our Best Spies are in Space"
August 26, 1999	The New York Times (Op-Ed Section)	"Spy Stories"
November 14, 1999	The Washington Post (Sunday Outlook Section)	"Loud and Clear: The Most Secret of Secret Agencies Operates Under Outdated Laws"
March 18, 2001	The New York Times Magazine	"My Friend the Spy"
April 5, 2001	The New York Times (Op-Ed Section)	"The Dangers of Spy Planes"
April 12, 2001	USA Today (Op-Ed Section)	"Rethink Spy Missions"
August 7, 2001	The Guardian (London)	"USS Liberty: The Cover-Up"
August 28, 2001	The New York Times (Op-Ed Section)	"Guard the Secrets, Then Catch the Spies"
September 18, 2001	The New York Times	"Of Atomic Secrets, Loyalty and Bitter Deceit"
December 2001	Nieman Reports (Harvard)	"Is the Press Up to The Task of Reporting The Stories of September 11?"
January 20, 2002	The Washington Post Book World	"The Wrong Man"
February 7, 2002	The New York Times	"A Former C.I.A. Cowboy And His Disillusioning Ride"
June 2, 2002	The Washington Post (Sunday Outlook Section)	"Too Much, Not Enough"
July 19, 2002	USA Today (Op-Ed Section)	"Linguist Reserve Corp Answers Terror Need"
August 27, 2002	The New York Times (Week in Review Section)	"Washington Bends the Rules"
August 29, 2002	USA Today (Op-Ed Section)	"Bush Wrong to Use Pretext as Excuse to Invade Iraq"
September 8, 2002	The New York Times (Week in Review Section)	"War of Secrets; Eyes in the Sky, Ears to the Wall, and Still Wanting"
September 8, 2002	The Washington Post Book World	"Strategic Thinking"
September 14, 2002	The Guardian (London)	"What Big Ears You Have"
September 16, 2001	USA Today (Op-Ed Section)	"Untested Administration Hawks Clamor for War"
October 24, 2002	USA Today (Op-Ed Section)	"Maintain CIA's Independence"
November 24, 2002	The New York Times (Week in Review Section)	"How to (De-)Centralize Intelligence"
December 15, 2002	The Washington Post Book World	"Shadow Warriors"
March 23, 2003	Los Angeles Times Book Review	"Ike as Spymaster: Secrets on High"
April 27, 2003	The Washington Post Book World	"Company Man"
July 4, 2003	The New York Times	"The Labyrinthine Morass of Spying in the Cold War"
February 29, 2004	The Washington Post Book World	"Sowing the Whirlwind"
May 9, 2004	Los Angeles Times Book Review	"Secret Warriors: The Great Game"
June 13, 2004	The New York Times (Op-Ed Section)	"This Spy for Rent"
February 20, 2005	The Washington Post Book World	"We're Watching Them"
March 28, 2005	The American Conservative	"Breeding Terror: The Intelligence Community Analyzes a Counterproductive War"
December 1, 2005	Rolling Stone	"The Man Who Sold The War"
December 25, 2005	The New York Times (Week in Review Section)	"The Agency That Could Be Big Brother"
January 9, 2006	The New York Times	"Where Spying Starts and Stops"
April 1, 2006	The Atlantic	"Big Brother is Listening"
August 10, 2006	Rolling Stone	"The Next War: Iran"
August 20, 2006	The New York Times Book Review	"Intelligence Test"
December 12, 2006	The Washington Post	"'Curveball' And A Slam Dunk"
January 31, 2007	The New York Times	"Bush Is Not Above the Law"
March 15, 2012	Wired	"The NSA Is Building the Country's Biggest Spy Center (Watch What You Say)"
April 3, 2012	Wired	"Shady Companies With Ties to Israel Wiretap the U.S. for the NSA"
November 7, 2013	GQ	"Raiders of the Congo"
June 12, 2013	Wired	"The Secret War"
August 2014	Wired	"Edward Snowden: The Untold Story"
August 2014	Wired	Video "The Most Wanted Man in the World: Behind the Scenes with Edward Snowden"
October 2, 2014	The Intercept	"The NSA And Me"
January 29, 2015	Foreign Policy	"Big Brother Doesn't Have to be a Bully"
March 25, 2015	Foreign Policy	"Reading This Magazine Could Land You in Jail"
May 11, 2015	Foreign Policy	"Frozen Assets: Inside the Spy War for Control of the Arctic"
July 21, 2015	Foreign Policy	"Missed Calls: Is the NSA Lying About it Failure to Prevent 9/11?"
September 28, 2015	The Intercept	"A Death in Athens: Did a Rogue NSA Operation Cause the Death of a Greek Telecom Employee?
September 29, 2015	Foreign Policy	"What @Snowden Told Me About the NSA's Cyberweapons"
November 10, 2015	Foreign Policy	"Who is the Man Behind Ben Carson's Foreign Policy?"
December 8, 2015	Foreign Policy	"Could American Spooks Provoke War With Beijing?"
January 22, 2016	Foreign Policy	"The Espionage Economy"
March 11, 2016	Foreign Policy	"Watch Thy Neighbor"
April 28, 2016	Foreign Policy	"Terrorists Have Drones Now. Thanks, Obama."
July 7, 2016	Foreign Policy	"It's Time for Obama to Send Home This Mass-Murdering Cuban Terrorist-in-Exile"
August 4, 2016	Reuters	"The World's Best Cyber Army Doesn't Belong to Russia"
August 21, 2016	Reuters	"Evidence Points to Another Snowden at the NSA"
September 7, 2016	Foreign Policy	"Every Move You Make: President Obama has Created the Most Intrusive Surveillance Apparatus in the World. To What End?"
September 20, 2016	Reuters	"How 'Snowden' The Movie Could Help Win a Pardon for Snowden the Man"
December 14, 2016	Foreign Policy	"Hello, Death Star: Russia had a Secret Cold War Space Station Equipped with Cannons"
January 6, 2017	Foreign Policy	"Donald Trump has the Keys to the Most Invasive Surveillance State in History"
March 20, 2017	Foreign Policy	"The Multibillion-Dollar U.S. Spy Agency You Have Never Heard Of"
May 31, 2017	Foreign Policy	"Washington's Ministry of Preemption"
March 19, 2018	The New Republic	"Anti-Intelligence: What Happens When a President Goes to War with His Own Spies?"
February 11, 2019	The New Republic	"The Spy Who Wasn't"
