= Johann Ludwig Klüber =

German law professor, author and state official

Johann Ludwig Klüber (10 November 1762, Tann, near Fulda - 16 February 1837, Frankfurt am Main) was a German law professor, author and state official.

== Biography ==
He was professor of law at the University of Erlangen (1786–1804), privat-referendar, state and cabinet counsel, in Karlsruhe (1804–07 and 1808–17), and professor of law at Heidelberg (1807–08). During the Congress of Vienna (1814–15), by government permission, he resided there and collected and published Akten des Wiener Kongresses in den Jahren 1814 and 1815 (8 vols., 1815–19). An enlarged edition (or just the most important portions according to NIE) was published 1830 under the title of Quellensammlung zu dem öffentlichen Rechte des Deutschen Bundes. Under Karl August von Hardenberg, chancellor of state for Prussia, he became privy councillor in the Ministry of Foreign Affairs (1817), and, under its auspices, he assisted in the Congress of Aix-la-Chapelle (1818), and in political negotiations in Frankfurt and Saint Petersburg. In 1822 he published the second edition of his Öffentlichen Rechte des Deutschen Bundes, which brought on political persecution of both book and author. He resigned his government position and retired to Frankfurt, where he died.

Other prominent works of his are:

- Versuch über die Geschichte der Gerichtslehen (1785)
- Staatsrecht des Rheinbundes (1808)
- Kryptographik Lehrbuch der Geheimschreibekunst (1809)
- Le droit des gens moderne de l'Europe (1819, 2nd ed., 1874)
- Abhandlungen und Beobachtungen für Geschichtskunde, Staats- und Rechtswissenschaften (1830–34)
- Die Selbständigkeit des Richteramtes und die Unabhängigkeit seiner Urteile in Rechtsprechen (1832)
- Pragmatische Geschichte der nationalen und politischen Wiedergeburt Griechenlandes (1835)
