= RSA Security =

American computer security company

RSA Security LLC
- Trade name: RSA
- Type: Independent
- Industry: Network security and authentication
- Founded: 1982; 44 years ago
- Founder: Ron Rivest; Adi Shamir; Leonard Adleman
- Headquarters: Burlington, Massachusetts, United States
- Key people: Greg Nelson, CEO (2025–present)
- Products: RSA Access Manager, RSA Adaptive Authentication, RSA Adaptive Authentication for eCommerce, RSA Archer Suite, RSA Authentication Manager, RSA Cybercrime Intelligence, RSA Data Loss Prevention, RSA Digital Certificate Solutions, RSA Federated Identity Manager, RSA FraudAction Services, RSA Identity Governance and Lifecycle, RSA NetWitness Endpoint, RSA NetWitness Investigator, RSA NetWitness Orchestrator, RSA NetWitness Platform, RSA NetWitness UEBA, RSA SecurID Access, RSA Web Threat Detection
- Number of employees: 2,700+
- Parent: Symphony Technology Group
- Website: www.rsa.com

RSA Security LLC, formerly RSA Security, Inc. and trade name RSA, is an American computer and network security company with a focus on encryption and decryption standards. RSA was named after the initials of its co-founders, Ron Rivest, Adi Shamir and Leonard Adleman, after whom the RSA public key cryptography algorithm was also named. Among its products is the SecurID authentication token. The BSAFE cryptography libraries were also initially owned by RSA. RSA is known for incorporating backdoors developed by the NSA in its products. It previously organized the annual RSA Conference, an information security conference, until the company sold the conference to Crosspoint Capital, Clearlake Capital, and Symphony Technology Group in March 2022.

Founded as an independent company in 1982, RSA Security was acquired by EMC Corporation in 2006 for US$2.1 billion and operated as a division within EMC. When EMC was acquired by Dell Technologies in 2016, RSA became part of the Dell Technologies family of brands. On 10 March 2020, Dell Technologies announced that they will be selling RSA Security to a consortium, led by Symphony Technology Group (STG), Ontario Teachers’ Pension Plan Board (Ontario Teachers’) and AlpInvest Partners (AlpInvest) for US$2.1 billion, the same price when it was bought by EMC back in 2006.

RSA is based in Burlington, Massachusetts, with regional headquarters in Bracknell (UK) and Singapore, and numerous international offices.

== History ==
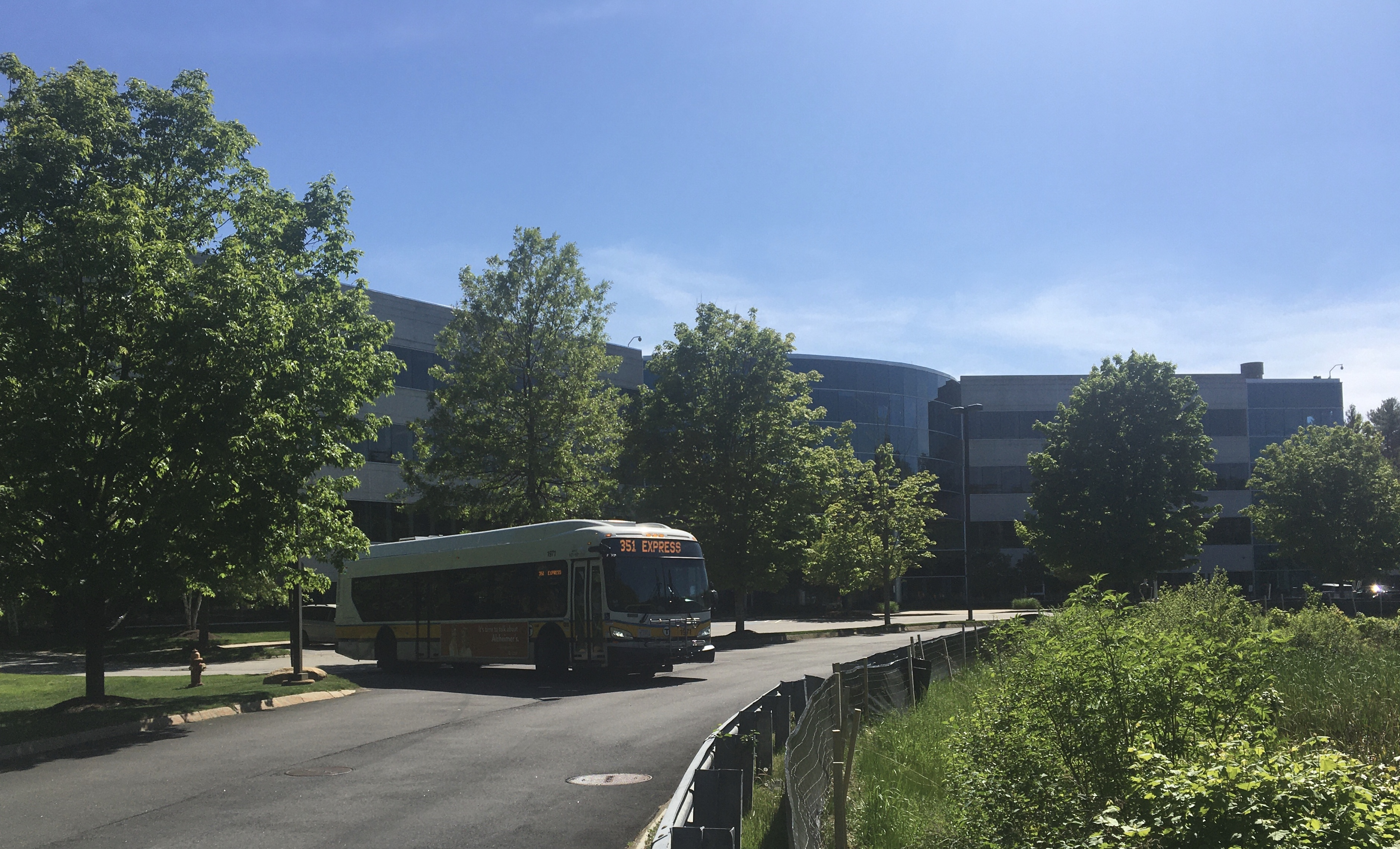
RSA headquarters in Burlington, Massachusetts

Ron Rivest, Adi Shamir and Leonard Adleman, who developed the RSA encryption algorithm in 1977, founded RSA Data Security in 1982. The company acquired a "worldwide exclusive license" from the Massachusetts Institute of Technology to a patent on the RSA cryptosystem technology granted in 1983.

- In 1994, RSA was against the Clipper chip during the Crypto War.
- In 1995, RSA sent a handful of people across the hall to found Digital Certificates International, better known as VeriSign.
- The company then called Security Dynamics acquired RSA Data Security in July 1996 and DynaSoft AB in 1997.
- In January 1997, it proposed the first of the DES Challenges which led to the first public breaking of a message based on the Data Encryption Standard.
- In February 2001, it acquired Xcert International, Inc., a privately held company that developed and delivered digital certificate-based products for securing e-business transactions.
- In June 2001, it acquired 3-G International, Inc., a privately held company that developed and delivered smart card and biometric authentication products.
- In August 2001, it acquired Securant Technologies, Inc., a privately held company that produced ClearTrust, an identity management product.
- In December 2005, it acquired Cyota, a privately held Israeli company specializing in online security and anti-fraud solutions for financial institutions.
- In April 2006, it acquired PassMark Security.
- On September 14, 2006, RSA stockholders approved the acquisition of the company by EMC Corporation for $2.1 billion.
- In 2007, RSA acquired Valyd Software, a Hyderabad-based Indian company specializing in file and data security.
- In 2009, RSA launched the RSA Share Project. As part of this project, some of the RSA BSAFE libraries were made available for free. To promote the launch, RSA ran a programming competition with a US$10,000 first prize.
- In March 2011, RSA suffered a security breach and its most valuable secrets were leaked, compromising the security of all existing RSA SecurID tokens.
- In 2011, RSA introduced a new CyberCrime Intelligence Service designed to help organizations identify computers, information assets and identities compromised by trojans and other online attacks.
- In July 2013, RSA acquired Aveksa the leader in Identity and Access Governance sector
- On September 7, 2016, RSA was acquired by and became a subsidiary of Dell EMC Infrastructure Solutions Group through the acquisition of EMC Corporation by Dell Technologies in a cash and stock deal led by Michael Dell.
- On February 18, 2020, Dell Technologies announced their intention to sell RSA for $2.075 billion to Symphony Technology Group.
- In anticipation of the sale of RSA to Symphony Technology Group, Dell Technologies made the strategic decision to retain the BSAFE product line. To that end, RSA transferred BSAFE products (including the Data Protection Manager product) and customer agreements, including maintenance and support, to Dell Technologies on July 1, 2020.
- On September 1, 2020, Symphony Technology Group (STG) completed its acquisition of RSA from Dell Technologies. RSA became an independent company, one of the world’s largest cybersecurity and risk management organizations.
- In September 2025, Greg Nelson was appointed Chief Executive Officer of RSA, succeeding Rohit Ghai.

== Controversy ==
=== SecurID security breach ===
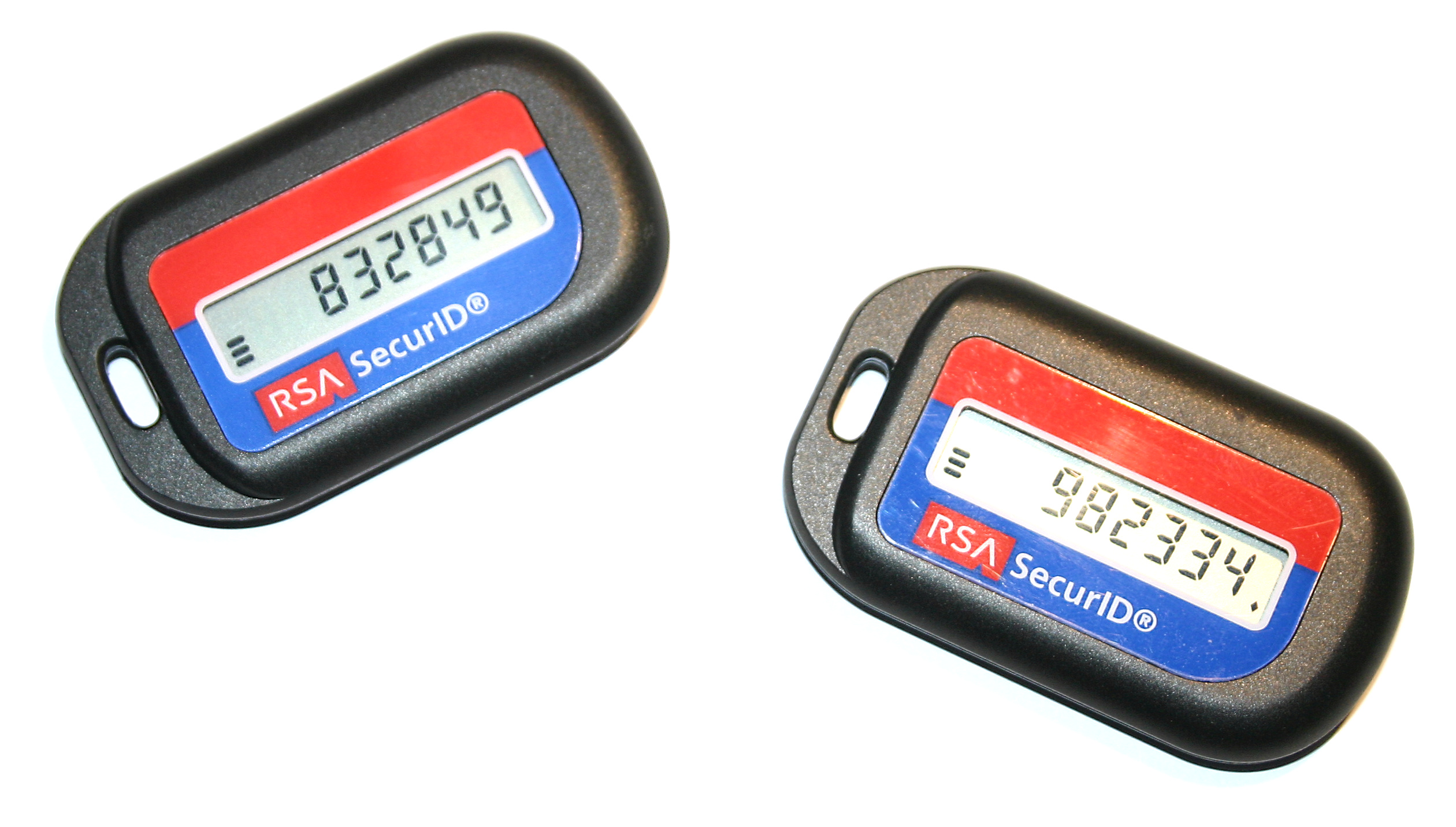
RSA SecurID security tokens.

On March 17, 2011, RSA disclosed an attack on its two-factor authentication products. The attack was similar to the Sykipot attacks, the July 2011 SK Communications hack, and the NightDragon series of attacks. RSA called it an advanced persistent threat. Today, SecurID is more commonly used as a software token rather than older physical tokens.

=== Relationship with NSA ===
RSA Security campaigned against the Clipper Chip backdoor in the so-called Crypto Wars, including the use of this iconic poster in the debate.

RSA's relationship with the NSA has changed over the years. Reuters' Joseph Menn and cybersecurity analyst Jeffrey Carr have noted that the two once had an adversarial relationship. In its early years, RSA and its leaders were prominent advocates of strong cryptography for public use, while the NSA and the Bush and Clinton administrations sought to prevent its proliferation.

For almost 10 years, I've been going toe to toe with these people at Fort Meade. The success of this company [RSA] is the worst thing that can happen to them. To them, we're the real enemy, we're the real target. We have the system that they're most afraid of. If the U.S. adopted RSA as a standard, you would have a truly international, interoperable, unbreakable, easy-to-use encryption technology. And all those things together are so synergistically threatening to the N.S.A.'s interests that it's driving them into a frenzy.

— RSA president James Bidzos, June 1994

In the mid-1990s, RSA and Bidzos led a "fierce" public campaign against the Clipper Chip, an encryption chip with a backdoor that would allow the U.S. government to decrypt communications. The Clinton administration pressed telecommunications companies to use the chip in their devices, and relaxed export restrictions on products that used it. (Such restrictions had prevented RSA Security from selling its software abroad.) RSA joined civil libertarians and others in opposing the Clipper Chip by, among other things, distributing posters with a foundering sailing ship and the words "Sink Clipper!" RSA Security also created the DES Challenges to show that the widely used DES encryption was breakable by well-funded entities like the NSA.

The relationship shifted from adversarial to cooperative after Bidzos stepped down as CEO in 1999, according to Victor Chan, who led RSA's department of engineering until 2005: "When I joined there were 10 people in the labs, and we were fighting the NSA. It became a very different company later on." For example, RSA was reported to have accepted $10 million from the NSA in 2004 in a deal to use the NSA-designed Dual EC DRBG random number generator in their BSAFE library, despite many indications that Dual_EC_DRBG was both of poor quality and possibly backdoored. RSA Security later released a statement about the Dual_EC_DRBG kleptographic backdoor:

We made the decision to use Dual EC DRBG as the default in BSAFE toolkits in 2004, in the context of an industry-wide effort to develop newer, stronger methods of encryption. At that time, the NSA had a trusted role in the community-wide effort to strengthen, not weaken, encryption. This algorithm is only one of multiple choices available within BSAFE toolkits, and users have always been free to choose whichever one best suits their needs. We continued using the algorithm as an option within BSAFE toolkits as it gained acceptance as a NIST standard and because of its value in FIPS compliance. When concern surfaced around the algorithm in 2007, we continued to rely upon NIST as the arbiter of that discussion. When NIST issued new guidance recommending no further use of this algorithm in September 2013, we adhered to that guidance, communicated that recommendation to customers and discussed the change openly in the media.

— RSA, The Security Division of EMC

In March 2014, it was reported by Reuters that RSA had also adapted the extended random standard championed by NSA. Later cryptanalysis showed that extended random did not add any security, and it was rejected by the prominent standards group Internet Engineering Task Force. Extended random did however make NSA's backdoor for Dual_EC_DRBG tens of thousands of times faster to use for attackers with the key to the Dual_EC_DRBG backdoor (presumably only NSA) because the extended nonces in extended random made part of the internal state of Dual_EC_DRBG easier to guess. Only RSA Security's Java version was hard to crack without extended random since the caching of Dual_EC_DRBG output in e.g. RSA Security's C programming language version already made the internal state fast enough to determine. And indeed, RSA Security only implemented extended random in its Java implementation of Dual_EC_DRBG.

=== NSA Dual_EC_DRBG backdoor ===
From 2004 to 2013, RSA shipped security software—BSAFE toolkit and Data Protection Manager—that included a default cryptographically secure pseudorandom number generator, Dual EC DRBG, that was later suspected to contain a secret National Security Agency kleptographic backdoor. The backdoor could have made data encrypted with these tools much easier to break for the NSA, which would have had the secret private key to the backdoor. Scientifically speaking, the backdoor employs kleptography, and is, essentially, an instance of the Diffie Hellman kleptographic attack published in 1997 by Adam Young and Moti Yung.

RSA Security employees should have been aware, at least, that Dual_EC_DRBG might contain a backdoor. Three employees were members of the ANSI X9F1 Tool Standards and Guidelines Group, to which Dual_EC_DRBG had been submitted for consideration in the early 2000s. The possibility that the random number generator could contain a backdoor was "first raised in an ANSI X9 meeting", according to John Kelsey, a co-author of the NIST SP 800-90A standard that contains Dual_EC_DRBG. In January 2005, two employees of the cryptography company Certicom—who were also members of the X9F1 group—wrote a patent application that described a backdoor for Dual_EC_DRBG identical to the NSA one. The patent application also described three ways to neutralize the backdoor. Two of these—ensuring that two arbitrary elliptic curve points P and Q used in Dual_EC_DRBG are independently chosen, and a smaller output length—were added to the standard as an option, though NSA's backdoored version of P and Q and large output length remained as the standard's default option. Kelsey said he knew of no implementers who actually generated their own non-backdoored P and Q, and there have been no reports of implementations using the smaller outlet.

Nevertheless, NIST included Dual_EC_DRBG in its 2006 NIST SP 800-90A standard with the default settings enabling the backdoor, largely at the behest of NSA officials, who had cited RSA Security's early use of the random number generator as an argument for its inclusion. The standard did also not fix the unrelated (to the backdoor) problem that the CSPRNG was predictable, which Gjøsteen had pointed out earlier in 2006, and which led Gjøsteen to call Dual_EC_DRBG not cryptographically sound.

ANSI standard group members and Microsoft employees Dan Shumow and Niels Ferguson made a public presentation about the backdoor in 2007. Commenting on Shumow and Ferguson's presentation, prominent security researcher and cryptographer Bruce Schneier called the possible NSA backdoor "rather obvious", and wondered why NSA bothered pushing to have Dual_EC_DRBG included, when the general poor quality and possible backdoor would ensure that nobody would ever use it. There does not seem to have been a general awareness that RSA Security had made it the default in some of its products in 2004, until the Snowden leak.

In September 2013, the New York Times, drawing on the Snowden leaks, revealed that the NSA worked to "Insert vulnerabilities into commercial encryption systems, IT systems, networks, and endpoint communications devices used by targets" as part of the Bullrun program. One of these vulnerabilities, the Times reported, was the Dual_EC_DRBG backdoor. With the renewed focus on Dual_EC_DRBG, it was noted that RSA Security's BSAFE used Dual_EC_DRBG by default, which had not previously been widely known.

After the New York Times published its article, RSA Security recommended that users switch away from Dual_EC_DRBG, but denied that they had deliberately inserted a backdoor. RSA Security officials have largely declined to explain why they did not remove the dubious random number generator once the flaws became known, or why they did not implement the simple mitigation that NIST added to the standard to neutralize the suggested and later verified backdoor.

On 20 December 2013, Reuters' Joseph Menn reported that NSA secretly paid RSA Security $10 million in 2004 to set Dual_EC_DRBG as the default CSPRNG in BSAFE. The story quoted former RSA Security employees as saying that "no alarms were raised because the deal was handled by business leaders rather than pure technologists". Interviewed by CNET, Schneier called the $10 million deal a bribe. RSA officials responded that they have not "entered into any contract or engaged in any project with the intention of weakening RSA’s products." Menn stood by his story, and media analysis noted that RSA's reply was a non-denial denial, which denied only that company officials knew about the backdoor when they agreed to the deal, an assertion Menn's story did not make.

In the wake of the reports, several industry experts cancelled their planned talks at RSA's 2014 RSA Conference. Among them was Mikko Hyppönen, a Finnish researcher with F-Secure, who cited RSA's denial of the alleged $10 million payment by the NSA as suspicious. Hyppönen announced his intention to give his talk, "Governments as Malware Authors", at a conference quickly set up in reaction to the reports: TrustyCon, to be held on the same day and one block away from the RSA Conference.

At the 2014 RSA Conference, former RSA Security Executive Chairman Art Coviello defended RSA Security's choice to keep using Dual_EC_DRBG by saying "it became possible that concerns raised in 2007 might have merit" only after NIST acknowledged the problems in 2013.

== Products ==
RSA is most known for its SecurID product, which provides two-factor authentication to hundreds of technologies utilizing hardware tokens that rotate keys on timed intervals, software tokens, and one-time codes. In 2016, RSA re-branded the SecurID platform as RSA SecurID Access. This release added Single-Sign-On capabilities and cloud authentication for resources using SAML 2.0 and other types of federation.

The RSA SecurID Suite also contains the RSA Identity Governance and Lifecycle software (formally Aveksa). The software provides visibility of who has access to what within an organization and manages that access with various capabilities such as access review, request and provisioning.

RSA enVision is a security information and event management (SIEM) platform, with centralised log-management service that claims to "enable organisations to simplify compliance process as well as optimise security-incident management as they occur." On April 4, 2011, EMC purchased NetWitness and added it to the RSA group of products. NetWitness was a packet capture tool aimed at gaining full network visibility to detect security incidents. This tool was re-branded RSA Security Analytics and was a combination of RSA enVIsion and NetWitness as a SIEM tool that did log and packet capture.

The RSA Archer GRC platform is software that supports business-level management of governance, risk management, and compliance (GRC). The product was originally developed by Archer Technologies, which EMC acquired in 2010.

== See also ==
- Hardware token
- RSA Factoring Challenge
- RSA Secret-Key Challenge
- BSAFE
- RSA SecurID
- Software token
- Dual_EC_DRBG
