= BSAFE =

Cryptography library

- Developers: Dell, formerly RSA Security
- Release: 1996
- Written in: C, assembly, Java
- Operating system: BSD, Linux, macOS, Microsoft Windows, Android, iOS, AIX, Solaris
- Type: Cryptography library, Commercial software
- License: Proprietary
- Website: www.dell.com

Dell BSAFE, formerly known as RSA BSAFE, is a FIPS 140-2 validated cryptography library, available in both C and Java. BSAFE was initially created by RSA Security, which was purchased by EMC and then, in turn, by Dell. When Dell sold the RSA business to Symphony Technology Group in 2020, Dell elected to retain the BSAFE product line. BSAFE was one of the most common encryption toolkits before the RSA patent expired in September 2000. It also contained implementations of the RCx ciphers, with the most common one being RC4. From 2004 to 2013 the default random number generator in the library was a NIST-approved RNG standard, widely known to be insecure from at least 2006, containing a kleptographic backdoor from the American National Security Agency (NSA), as part of its secret Bullrun program. In 2013 Reuters revealed that RSA had received a payment of $10 million to set the compromised algorithm as the default option. The RNG standard was subsequently withdrawn in 2014, and the RNG removed from BSAFE beginning in 2015.

== Cryptography backdoors ==
=== Dual_EC_DRBG random number generator ===
From 2004 to 2013, the default cryptographically secure pseudorandom number generator (CSPRNG) in BSAFE was Dual_EC_DRBG, which contained an alleged backdoor from NSA, in addition to being a biased and slow CSPRNG. The cryptographic community had been aware that Dual_EC_DRBG was a very poor CSPRNG since shortly after the specification was posted in 2005, and by 2007 it had become apparent that the CSPRNG seemed to be designed to contain a hidden backdoor for NSA, usable only by NSA via a secret key. In 2007, Bruce Schneier described the backdoor as "too obvious to trick anyone to use it." The backdoor was confirmed in the Snowden leaks in 2013, and it was insinuated that NSA had paid RSA Security US$10 million to use Dual_EC_DRBG by default in 2004, though RSA Security denied that they knew about the backdoor in 2004. The Reuters article which revealed the secret $10 million contract to use Dual_EC_DRBG described the deal as "handled by business leaders rather than pure technologists". RSA Security has largely declined to explain their choice to continue using Dual_EC_DRBG even after the defects and potential backdoor were discovered in 2006 and 2007, and has denied knowingly inserting the backdoor.

So why would RSA pick Dual_EC as the default? You got me. Not only is Dual_EC hilariously slow – which has real performance implications – it was shown to be a just plain bad random number generator all the way back in 2006. By 2007, when Shumow and Ferguson raised the possibility of a backdoor in the specification, no sensible cryptographer would go near the thing. And the killer is that RSA employs a number of highly distinguished cryptographers! It's unlikely that they'd all miss the news about Dual_EC.

— Matthew Green, cryptographer and research professor at Johns Hopkins University, A Few Thoughts on Cryptographic Engineering (From after the backdoor was confirmed, but before the $10 million secret deal was revealed by Reuters.)

As a cryptographically secure random number generator is often the basis of cryptography, much data encrypted with BSAFE was not secure against NSA. Specifically it has been shown that the backdoor makes SSL/TLS completely breakable by the party having the private key to the backdoor (i.e. NSA). Since the US government and US companies have also used the vulnerable BSAFE, NSA can potentially have made US data less safe, if NSA's secret key to the backdoor had been stolen. It is also possible to derive the secret key by solving a single instance of the algorithm's elliptic curve problem (breaking an instance of elliptic curve cryptography is considered unlikely with current computers and algorithms, but a breakthrough may occur).

In June 2013, Edward Snowden began leaking NSA documents. In November 2013, RSA switched the default to HMAC DRBG with SHA-256 as the default option. The following month, Reuters published the report based on the Snowden leaks stating that RSA had received a payment of $10 million to set Dual_EC_DRBG as the default.

With subsequent releases of Crypto-C Micro Edition 4.1.2 (April 2016), Micro Edition Suite 4.1.5 (April 2016) and Crypto-J 6.2 (March 2015), Dual_EC_DRBG was removed entirely.

=== Extended Random TLS extension ===
"Extended Random" was a proposed extension for the Transport Layer Security (TLS) protocol, submitted for standardization to IETF by an NSA employee, although it never became a standard. The extension would otherwise be harmless, but together with the Dual_EC_DRBG, it would make it easier to take advantage of the backdoor.

The extension was previously not known to be enabled in any implementations, but in December 2017, it was found enabled on some Canon printer models, which use the RSA BSAFE library, because the extension number conflicted a part of TLS version 1.3.

== Product suite history ==
- Crypto-J is a Java encryption library. In 1997, RSA Data Security licensed Baltimore Technologies' J/CRYPTO library, with plans to integrate it as part of its new JSAFE encryption toolkit and released the first version of JSAFE the same year. JSAFE 1.0 was featured in the January 1998 edition of Byte magazine.
- Cert-J is a Public Key Infrastructure API software library, written in Java. It contains the cryptographic support necessary to generate certificate requests, create and sign digital certificates, and create and distribute certificate revocation lists. As of Cert-J 6.2.4, the entire API has been deprecated in favor of similar functionality provided BSAFE Crypto-J JCE API.
- BSAFE Crypto-C Micro Edition (Crypto-C ME) was initially released in June 2001 under the name "RSA BSAFE Wireless Core 1.0". The initial release targeted Microsoft Windows, EPOC, Linux, Solaris and Palm OS.
- BSAFE Micro Edition Suite is a cryptography SDK in C. BSAFE Micro Edition Suite was initially announced in February 2002 as a combined offering of BSAFE SSL-C Micro Edition, BSAFE Cert-C Micro Edition and BSAFE Crypto-C Micro Edition. Both SSL-C Micro Edition and Cert-C Micro Edition reached EOL in September 2014, while Micro Edition Suite remains supported with Crypto-C Micro Edition as its FIPS-validated cryptographic provider.
- SSL-C is an SSL toolkit in the BSAFE suite. It was originally written by Eric A. Young and Tim J. Hudson, as a fork of the open library SSLeay, that they developed prior to joining RSA. SSL-C reached End Of Life in December 2016.
- SSL-J is a Java toolkit that implements TLS. SSL-J was released as part of RSA JSAFE initial product offering in 1997. Crypto-J is the default cryptographic provider of SSL-J.

== Product suite support status ==
On November 25, 2015, RSA announced End of Life (EOL) dates for BSAFE. The End of Primary Support (EOPS) was to be reached on January 31, 2017, and the End of Extended Support (EOXS) was originally set to be January 31, 2019. That date was later further extended by RSA for some versions until January 31, 2022. During Extended Support, even though the support policy stated that only the most severe problems would be patched, new versions were released containing bugfixes, security fixes and new algorithms.

On December 12, 2020, Dell announced the reversal of RSA's past decision, allowing BSAFE product support beyond January 2022 as well as the possibility to soon acquire new licenses. Dell also announced it was rebranding the toolkits to Dell BSAFE.
