= Niels Ferguson =

Dutch cryptographer (born 1965)

Niels T. Ferguson (born 10 December 1965, in Eindhoven) is a Dutch cryptographer and consultant. He has collaborated with others, including Bruce Schneier, designing cryptographic algorithms, testing algorithms and protocols, and writing papers and books. Among the designs Ferguson has contributed to is the AES finalist block cipher algorithm Twofish as well as the stream cipher Helix and the Skein hash function.

In 1999, Niels Ferguson, together with Bruce Schneier and John Kelsey, developed the Yarrow algorithm, a Cryptographically-Secure Pseudorandom Number Generator (CSPRNG). Yarrow was later further developed by Niels Ferguson and Bruce Schneier into the Fortuna CSPRNG.

In 2001, he claimed to have broken the HDCP system that is incorporated into HD DVD and Blu-ray Discs players, similar to the DVDs Content Scramble System, but has not published his research, citing the Digital Millennium Copyright Act of 1998, which would make such publication illegal.

Ferguson worked for Microsoft for 21 years. In 2006 he published a paper covering some of his work around Bitlocker full disk encryption at Microsoft.

At the CRYPTO 2007 conference rump session, Dan Shumow and Niels Ferguson presented an informal paper describing a potential kleptographic backdoor in the NIST specified Dual_EC_DRBG cryptographically secure pseudorandom number generator. The kleptographic backdoor was confirmed to be real in 2013 as part of the Edward Snowden leaks.
