= Cyberspace Electronic Security Act =

The Cyberspace Electronic Security Act of 1999 (CESA) is a bill proposed by the Clinton administration during the 106th United States Congress that enables the government to harvest keys used in encryption. The Cyberspace Electronic Security Act gives law enforcement the ability to gain access to encryption keys and cryptography methods. The initial version of this act enabled federal law enforcement agencies to secretly use monitoring, electronic capturing equipment and other technologies to access and obtain information. These provisions were later stricken from the act, although federal law enforcement agencies still have a significant degree of latitude to conduct investigations relating to electronic information. The act generated discussion about what capabilities should be allowed to law enforcement in the detection of criminal activity. After vocal objections from civil liberties groups, the administration backed away from the controversial bill.

== See also ==
- Computer security
