= Subliminal channel =

Covert cryptographic channel

In cryptography, subliminal channels are covert channels that can be used to communicate secretly in normal looking communication over an insecure channel. Subliminal channels in digital signature crypto systems were found in 1984 by Gustavus Simmons.

Simmons describes how the "Prisoners' Problem" can be solved through parameter substitution in digital signature algorithms. (Note: Simmons' Prisoners' Problem is not the same as the Prisoner's Dilemma.)

== Examples ==
An easy example of a narrowband subliminal channel for normal human-language text would be to define that an even word count in a sentence is associated with the bit "0" and an odd word count with the bit "1". The question "Hello, how do you do?" would therefore send the subliminal message "1".

The Digital Signature Algorithm has one subliminal broadband and three subliminal narrow-band channels

== Improvements ==
A modification to the Brickell and DeLaurentis signature scheme provides a broadband channel without the necessity to share the authentication key. The Newton channel is not a subliminal channel, but it can be viewed as an enhancement.

== Countermeasures ==
With the help of the zero-knowledge proof and the commitment scheme it is possible to prevent the usage of the subliminal channel.

This countermeasure has a 1-bit subliminal channel because there is the problem that a proof can succeed or purposely fail.

Another countermeasure can detect, and not prevent, the subliminal usage of the randomness.
