= Hiss (electromagnetic) =

Electromagnetic wave phenomenon

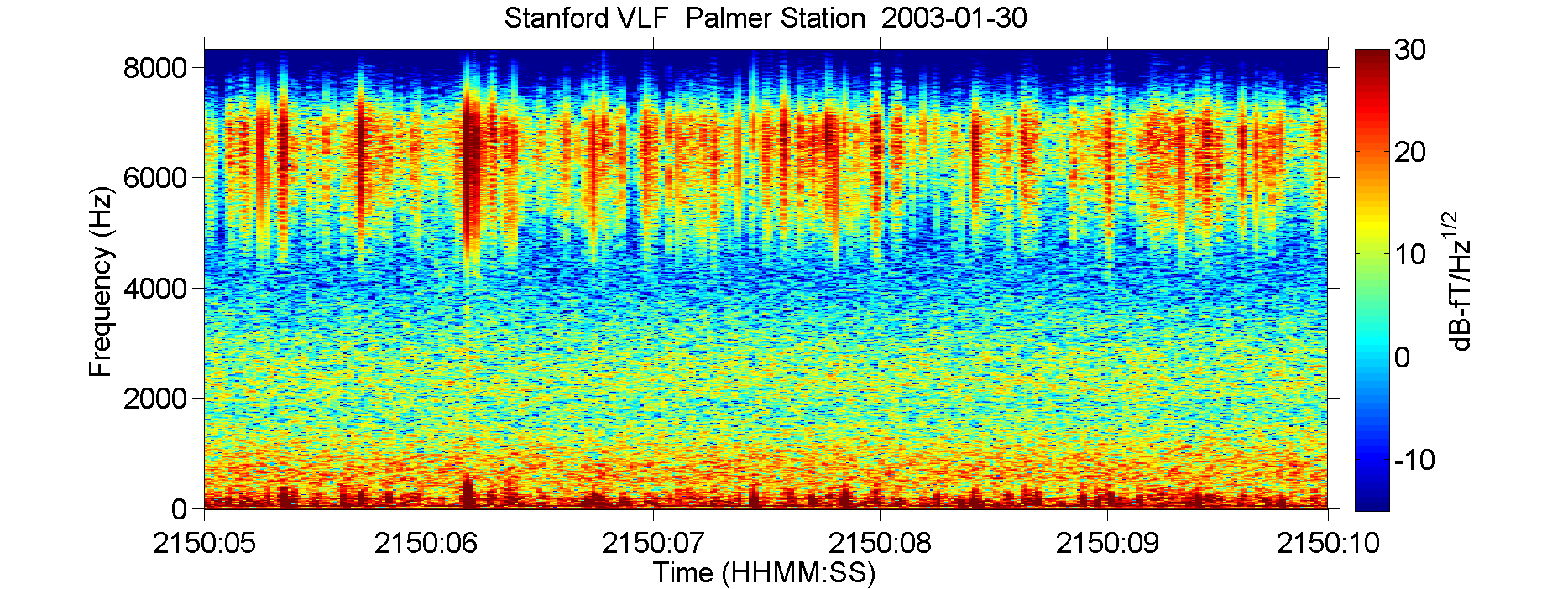
VLF spectrogram of electromagnetic hiss, as received by the Stanford University VLF group's wave receiver at Palmer Station, Antarctica. The hiss can be seen between 500 Hz and 4000 Hz, sandwiched between components of sferics

Electromagnetic hiss is a naturally occurring Extremely Low Frequency/Very Low Frequency electromagnetic wave (i.e., 300 Hz – 10 kHz) that is generated in the plasma of either the Earth's ionosphere or magnetosphere. Its name is derived from its incoherent, structureless spectral properties which, when played through an audio system, sound like white noise (hence the onomatopoetic name, "hiss").

== Varieties ==
Hiss may be observed in any of several varieties depending on local time and L-shell of the observer:

- Plasmaspheric hiss is generally observed within the plasmasphere, peaking in frequency slightly below ~1 kHz and rarely exceeding 3 kHz.
- Exo-hiss and ELF hiss are two varieties of hiss observed outside of the plasmasphere, both having a spectrum similar to that of plasmaspheric hiss.
- Midlatitude hiss is generally observed outside of the plasmasphere and tends to have frequencies between 2 and 10 kHz.
- Auroral hiss is observed in the auroral zones of the Earth and can extend up to several hundred kHz.

== Generation mechanisms ==
There are several proposed generation mechanisms for plasmaspheric hiss in particular, including:

- Generation from discrete chorus emissions
- Generation via electromagnetic impulses from terrestrial lightning, specifically via lightning-generated whistlers
- Generation through coherent nonlinear interaction with energetic electrons near the equatorial plasmasphere

== See also ==
- Dawn chorus (electromagnetic)
- Whistler (radio)
