= Noise floor =

Level of background noise in a signal

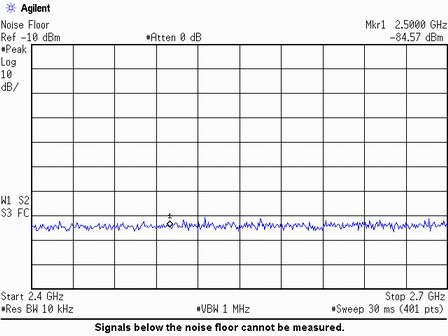
Measurement from a spectrum analyzer showing a noise-like measurement from an unspecified component.

In signal theory, the noise floor is the measure of the signal created from the sum of all the noise sources and unwanted signals within a measurement system, where noise is defined as any signal other than the one being monitored.

== Types ==
In radio communication and electronics, this may include thermal noise, black body, cosmic noise as well as atmospheric noise from distant thunderstorms and similar and any other unwanted man-made signals, sometimes referred to as incidental noise. If the dominant noise is generated within the measuring equipment (for example by a receiver with a poor noise figure) then this is an example of an instrumentation noise floor, as opposed to a physical noise floor. These terms are not always clearly defined, and are sometimes confused.

== Detection and measurement ==
Avoiding interference between electrical systems is the distinct subject of electromagnetic compatibility (EMC).

In a measurement system such as a seismograph, the physical noise floor may be set by the incidental noise, and may include nearby foot traffic or a nearby road. The noise floor limits the smallest measurement that can be taken with certainty since any measured amplitude can on average be no less than the noise floor.

A common way to lower the noise floor in electronics systems is to cool the system to reduce thermal noise, when this is the major noise source. In special circumstances, the noise floor can also be artificially lowered with digital signal processing techniques.

Signals that are below the noise floor can be detected by using different techniques of spread spectrum communications, where signal of a particular information bandwidth is deliberately spread in the frequency domain resulting in a signal with a wider occupied bandwidth.

Every additional 6.02 dB of noise floor corresponds to a 1-bit reduction of the effective number of bits of an analog-to-digital converter or digital-to-analog converter.

== See also ==
- Atmospheric noise
- Blackbody
- Cosmic noise
- Noise
- Noise (spectral phenomenon)
- Signal-to-noise ratio
- Thermal noise
