= Magnetosphere chronology =

Discoveries about the magnetosphere

The following is a chronology of discoveries concerning the magnetosphere.

- 1600 - William Gilbert in London suggests the Earth is a giant magnet.
- 1741 - Hiorter and Anders Celsius note that the polar aurora is accompanied by a disturbance of the magnetic needle.
- 1820 - Hans Christian Ørsted discovers electric currents create magnetic effects. André-Marie Ampère deduces that magnetism is basically the force between electric currents.
- 1833 - Carl Friedrich Gauss and Wilhelm Weber worked out the mathematical theory for separating the inner and outer magnetosphere sources of Earth's magnetic field.
- 1843 - Samuel Schwabe, a German amateur astronomer, shows the existence of an 11-year sunspot cycle.
- 1859 - Richard Carrington in England observes a solar flare; 17 hours later a large magnetic storm begins.
- 1892 - George Ellery Hale introduces the spectroheliograph, observing the Sun in hydrogen light from the chromosphere, a sensitive way of detecting flares. He confirms the connection between flares and magnetic storms.
- 1900-3 - Kristian Birkeland experiments with beams of electrons aimed at a magnetized sphere ("terrella") in a vacuum chamber. The electrons hit near the magnetic poles, leading him to propose that the polar aurora is created by electron beams from the Sun. Birkeland also observes magnetic disturbances associated with the aurora, suggesting to him that localized "polar magnetic storms" exist in the auroral zone.
- 1902 - Marconi successfully sends radio signals across the Atlantic Ocean. Oliver Heaviside suggests that the radio waves found their way around the curving Earth because they were reflected from electrically conducting layer at the top of the atmosphere.
- 1926 - Gregory Breit and Merle Tuve measure the distance to the conducting layer—which R. Watson-Watt proposes naming "ionosphere"—by measuring the time needed for a radio signal to bounce back.
- 1930-1 - After Birkeland's "electron beam" theory is disproved, Sydney Chapman and Vincent Ferraro in England propose that magnetic storms are caused when plasma clouds ejected from the Sun envelope the Earth.
- 1949 - A sudden increase in cosmic rays is traced to an eruption on the Sun. A much larger "flare event" occurs on February 23, 1956.
- 1953 - Owen Storey proves that "whistler" radio waves are produced by lightning and are often guided through distant space along field lines of the Earth's magnetic field.
- 1954 - Meredith, Gottlieb and Van Allen use a rocket in the auroral zone to detect radiation from the aurora.
- 1957 - Sputnik 1 launched by the Soviet Union, the first artificial satellite.
- 1958 - Explorer 1, built by Van Allen and his Iowa group and launched by the US January 31, observes the radiation belt. Explorer 3, launched in March, comes up with the first clear evidence for its existence.
- 1958 - Eugene Parker (Chicago) proposes the theory of the solar wind.
- 1958 - Pioneer 3 observes the outer radiation belt.
- 1958 - Project Argus, 3 small nuclear bombs above the south Atlantic Ocean, creates artificial radiation belts, lasting about 2 weeks. The project also creates artificial aurora.
- 1959 - Thomas Gold proposes the name "Magnetosphere"
- 1961 - James Dungey in Britain proposes a reconnection mechanism for transmitting solar wind energy to the magnetosphere by direct magnetic linkage between the two.
- 1961 - Ian Axford and Colin Hines (Canada) raise an alternative possibility, of energization by fluid friction at the boundary between the two.
- 1961 - The magnetopause, boundary between magnetosphere and the solar wind, is observed by Explorer 12. The measurements confirm predictions made in 1931 by Chapman and Ferraro.
- 1962 - In July, a U.S. H-bomb test (Project Starfish) above the central Pacific Ocean creates a radiation belt of high-energy electrons, parts of which remain until 1967. The new belt creates aurora at Samoa and unexpectedly knocks out 3 artificial satellites.
- 1964 - IMP-1 (Interplanetary Monitoring Platform 1) reports a large bow shock formed in the solar wind ahead of the magnetosphere, and a long magnetic tail on the night side of the Earth.
- 1964 - Syun-Ichi Akasofu (Japan-U.S.) and Sydney Chapman revive and expand Birkeland's notion of a "polar magnetic storm", now named "magnetic substorm."
- 1971 - Ionospheric O+ ions found among energetic particles trapped in the Earth's magnetic field, evidence that O+ ions are pulled out of the ionosphere and accelerated
- 1972 - Observations of the diffuse aurora are reported, made by the Canadian spacecraft Isis 2.
- 1974 - A large-scale pattern of "Birkeland currents" between space and the auroral zone traced by Alfred Zmuda and Jim Armstrong, using the Navy's "Triad" satellite.
- 1974 - David Evans presents evidence that auroral electrons are accelerated within 8000 km or so of Earth.
- 1977 - The S3-3 satellite of the U.S. Air Force observes the upward acceleration of O+ ions, related to the downward acceleration of electrons in the polar aurora.
- 1981 - High resolution auroral images are obtained by the Dynamics Explorer satellite.
- 1983 - ISEE-3 (International Sun-Earth Explorer 3) explores the distant magnetotail, observes that the distant tail plasma flows (past about 70 RE) away from Earth.
- 1985 - An "artificial comet" is produced by a cloud of barium ions, released by the German IRM (Ion Release Module) satellite. Meanwhile, another AMPTE spacecraft, CCE (Charge Composition Explorer) observes mass and energy distribution in the ring current, including its peak energies around 65 keV.
