= Radio noise =

Unwanted radio frequency signals

In radio reception, radio noise (commonly referred to as radio static) is unwanted random radio frequency electrical signals, fluctuating voltages, always present in a radio receiver in addition to the desired radio signal.

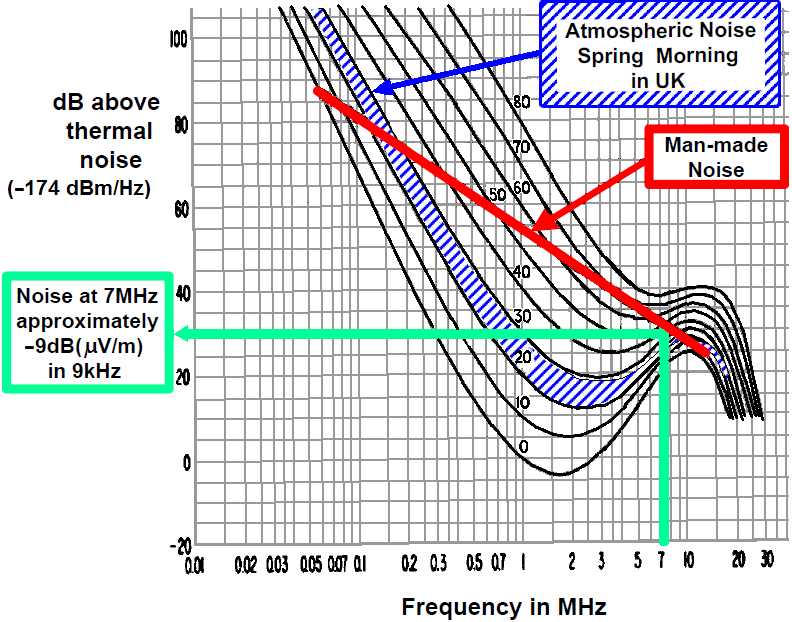
Atmospheric noise and human-caused noise as a function of frequency in the LF, MF, and HF radio spectrum according to CCIR 322. The vertical axis is in decibels above the thermal noise floor. The graph shows that as frequency drops atmospheric noise dominates other sources, and that as frequency rises, although all noise quiets, human-caused noise exceeds atmospheric noise.

Radio noise is a combination of natural electromagnetic atmospheric noise ("spherics", static) created by electrical processes in the atmosphere like lightning; human-made radio frequency interference (RFI) from other electrical devices picked up by the receiver's antenna; and thermal noise present in the receiver input circuits, mostly caused by the random thermal motion of molecules inside resistors.

== Effects of noise on radio ==
Radio noise near in frequency to a received radio signal (in the receiver's passband) interferes (RFI) with the operation of the receiver's circuitry. The level of noise determines the maximum sensitivity and reception range of a radio receiver; if no noise were picked up with radio signals, even weak transmissions could be received at virtually any distance by making a radio receiver that had high enough amplification, with low enough internal-noise.

The limiting noise source in a receiver depends on the frequency range in use: At frequencies below about 40 MHz but above about 20 MHz, nearby radio frequency interference caused by human-made devices is the main issue, and lightning in occasional storms that pass within line-of-sight of the antenna. Atmospheric noise is variably comparable to human-caused noise below 20 MHz, and particularly severe in the mediumwave and longwave bands, or even lower frequencies; below about 200 kHz atmospheric noise typically dominates.

With radio noise present, if a radio source is so weak and far away that the radio signal in the receiver has a lower amplitude than the average noise, the noise will drown out the signal. The level of noise in a communications circuit is measured by the signal-to-noise ratio (SNR, S / N ), the ratio of the average amplitude of the signal voltage to the average amplitude of the noise voltage. When this ratio is below one (0 dB) the noise is greater than the signal, requiring special processing to recover the information, if that is even possible.

== Atmospheric noise ==
Atmospheric noise ("spherics", static, or QRN) created by natural electrical events in the atmosphere, principally lightning in tropical storms. At frequencies below about 20 MHz the ionosphere traps radio waves inside the atmosphere – the same phenomenon that enables continent-wide up to world-wide communication in the shortwaves. Above about 30 MHz any noise freely radiates through the ionosphere and dissipates into space; at those higher frequencies naturally-caused noise only troubles radio receivers within line-of-sight of a nearby lightning storm. The same effect applies to human-caused radio interference.

== Human-caused radio interference ==
Human-caused radio frequency interference (RFI, EMI, or QRM) arises from electrical switches, motors, vehicle ignition circuits, computers, and other man-made sources tend to be above the thermal noise floor in the receiver's circuits. These noises are often also referred to as "static".

Human-caused electromagnetic interference (EMI) can disrupt the operation of any electronic equipment in general, not just radios, causing malfunction. In recent years standards have been developed for the levels of electromagnetic radiation that electronic equipment is permitted to radiate, and normal levels which equipment is expected to tolerate. These standards are aimed at ensuring what is referred to as electromagnetic compatibility (EMC).

== Astronomical noise sources ==
Cosmic background noise is experienced at frequencies above about 15 MHz when highly directional antennas are pointed toward the Sun or to certain other radio-bright objects in the sky, such as the center of the Milky Way Galaxy, or the planet Jupiter.

== Thermal noise ==
At very high frequency (VHF) and ultra high frequency (UHF) and above, atmospheric noise and human-made noise are often low, and thermal noise generated within the radio's own circuitry is usually the limiting factor. In the most sensitive receivers at these frequencies – radio telescopes and spacecraft communication – thermal noise is reduced by cooling the RF front end of the receiver to cryogenic temperatures.

== See also ==
- Astronomical radio source
- Atmospheric noise
- Cosmic noise
- Electromagnetic interference
- Jupiter radio source
- Johnson–Nyquist (thermal) noise
- Noise
- Radio propagation
- Shot noise
- Solar radio emission
