= FR-1 (satellite) =

French scientific satellite; the second French satellite

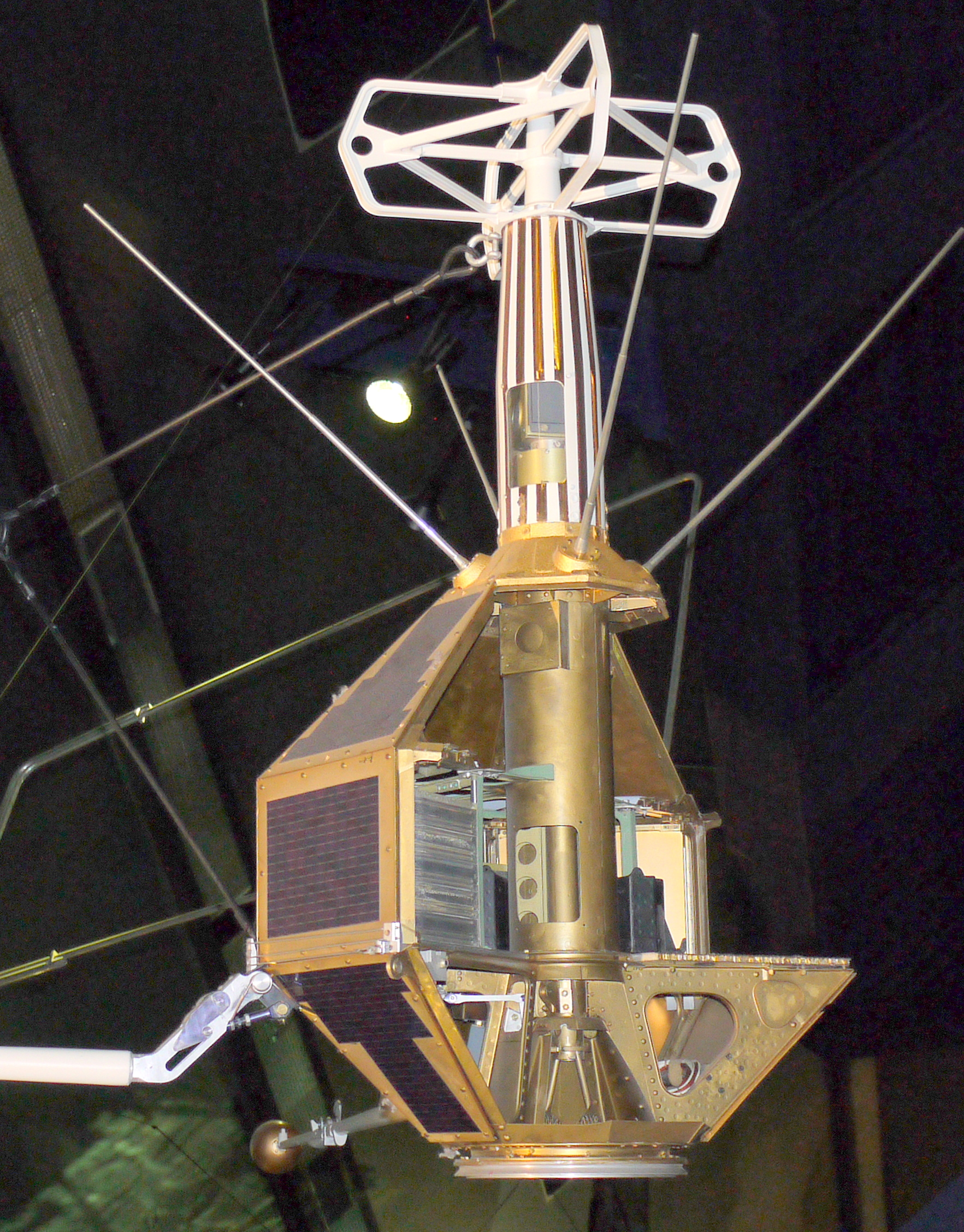
- Cutaway replica of FR-1 at the Musée de l'air et de l'espace
- Names: FR-1; FR1; FR 1 FR.1; FR-1A; FRANCE; FRANCE 1 France 1 French 1
- Mission type: Scientific
- Operator: CNES, CNET, NASA
- Harvard designation: 1965-101A
- COSPAR ID: 1965-101A
- SATCAT no.: 1814
- Mission duration: 1,180 days

Spacecraft properties
- Manufacturer: CNES, CNET, Nord Aviation
- Launch mass: 60 kg (130 lb), 71.7 kg (158 lb), or 135 lb (61 kg)

Start of mission
- Launch date: 6 December 1965, 21:05:47 UTC
- Rocket: Scout X-4
- Launch site: Vandenberg Air Force Base Western Range

End of mission
- Last contact: 28 February 1969

Orbital parameters
- Reference system: Geocentric
- Regime: Low Earth
- Semi-major axis: 7,049 kilometres (4,380 mi)
- Perigee altitude: 696 kilometres (432 mi)
- Apogee altitude: 707 kilometres (439 mi)
- Inclination: 75.9 degrees
- Period: 98.2 minutes
- Epoch: 6 December 1965

FR-1 was the second French satellite. Planned as the first French satellite, it was launched on 6 December 1965—ten days after the actual first French satellite, Astérix—by an American Scout X-4 rocket from the Western Range at Vandenberg Air Force Base. The scientific satellite studied the composition and structure of the ionosphere, plasmasphere, and magnetosphere by measuring the propagation of very low frequency (VLF) waves and the electron density of plasma in those portions of the Earth's atmosphere. FR-1's VLF receiver operated until 26 August 1968. FR-1 remains in orbit as of 2023.

== Background ==
FR-1 was the first step of an ambitious French plan to launch six FR-series satellites, each meant to study a different aspect of the Earth's atmosphere. FR-1 was generally designed to study the Earth's magnetic and electric fields in the ionosphere and magnetosphere. The satellite Astérix—ultimately France's first satellite, launched ten days before FR-1—was initially conceptualized as the second FR satellite under the name FR-2. Like FR-1, FR-2 would study the ionosphere. FR-3 was to be a "scaled-up" version of FR-2, with FR-4 to carry instruments measuring hydrogen distribution in the upper atmosphere, FR-5 to study "magnetic impulses" and serve as a platform for future research, and FR-6 to be a solar-stabilized spacecraft with final payload to be determined based on experimental results from its antecedents.

The French space agencies Centre national d'études spatiales (CNES) and Centre national d'études des télécommunications (CNET) were developing FR-1 concurrent with Astérix as early as 1963. That year, a model of FR-1 was displayed at the 25th Paris Air Show. Payload tests launched from NASA's Wallops Flight Facility (WFF) were planned for autumn 1963. Initial plans called for a late 1964 or early 1965 launch of FR-1 at the Pacific Missile Range, today's Western Range, with Astérix's launch scheduled for early 1965. Astérix was orbited prior to FR-1 because Charles de Gaulle and CNES wanted France to become the third space power by launching an independently-developed satellite on a French launcher, a propaganda coup for French exceptionalism during the Cold War.

== Spacecraft design ==
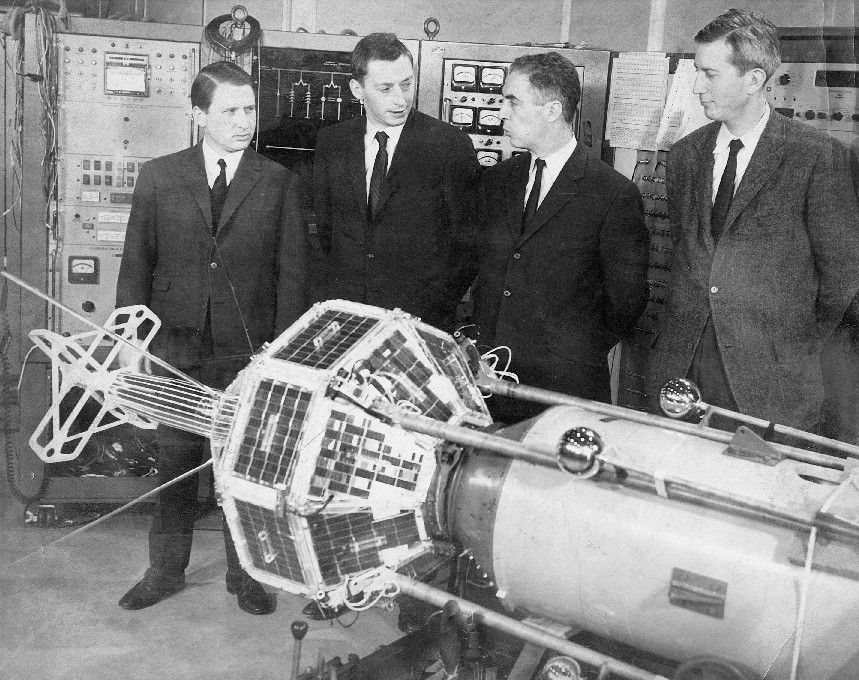
FR-1 mounted on a Scout rocket prior to launch in 1965; from left to right, C. Fayard, X. Namy, J. P. Causse, and L. R. O. Storey

FR-1 was a joint American-French project. CNES and CNET collaborated with the Goddard Space Flight Center (GSFC) on and received funding from NASA's Office of Space Science and Applications for the satellite's design, development, and construction. Xavier Namy of CNES and Samuel R. Stevens of GSFC served as project managers. Dr. Llewelyn Robert Owen Storey of CNET (later NASA) was the primary designer of the satellite's scientific instruments, working in concert with Dr. Robert W. Rochelle of GSFC. French scientists C. Fayard of CNET and Jean-Pierre Causse also worked on the project. French aerospace contractor Nord Aviation helped build the satellite.

The design, construction, and launch of FR-1 and Astérix went relatively quickly thanks to three related factors: postwar knowledge gained from Nazi scientists and their work on the V-2 rocket, France's independent development of nuclear IRBM launchers including the Saphir and Diamant rockets, and France's collaborative civilian research with the United States (through NASA) and other European countries (through CERN and ESRO).

FR-1 consists of two truncated octagonal pyramids, joined at their bases by an octagonal prism measuring 68.6 centimetres (27.0 in) across from corner to corner and about 71.2 centimetres (28.0 in) high. Solar cells cover the satellite's exterior. A probe for measuring local electron density extends 48.3 centimetres (19.0 in) downward from the base of this octagonal structure. A 71.2-centimetre (28.0 in) high magnetic field antenna and its supporting tube extend upward from the top of the structure. Four telemetry antennas extend diagonally upward and out from the base of this supporting tube. Four 198-centimetre (78 in) long electric field antenna booms extend outward from the base of the octagonal prism. During its operational lifespan, the spacecraft was spin-stabilized, with altitude and spin determination made from Sun sensor and three-axis fluxgate magnetometer observations. Depending on the source, the satellite's launch mass is cited as 60 kilograms (130 lb), 71.7 kilograms (158 lb), or 135 pounds (61 kg).

The mission objective was to study the composition and structure of the ionosphere, plasmasphere, and magnetosphere by measuring the propagation of very low frequency (VLF) waves and the local electron density of plasma in those atmospheric layers. For the VLF wave experiments, stations located on land in Seine-Port, France (at the Sainte-Assise transmitter), and Balboa, Panama, transmitted signals at 16.8 kHz and 24 kHz, respectively, while the satellite's magnetic and electric sensors orbiting about 750 kilometres (470 mi) away analyzed the magnetic field of the received wave.

== Mission and results ==
NASA launched two suborbital FR-1 payload tests on 17 October and 31 October 1963, followed by two more pre-mission test flights on 17 September and 25 September 1965, all at Wallops Flight Facility and using Aerobee 150A rockets. In October 1965 Ling-Temco-Vought (LTV; manufacturer of the Scout rocket) and a team of French scientists confirmed the satellite and rocket interfaced properly at LTV's Dallas facility.

FR-1 was launched on 6 December 1965 at either 20:07 or 21:05:47 UTC—ten days after the first French satellite, Astérix—by an American Scout X-4 four-stage rocket from Vandenberg Space Launch Complex 5 of the Western Range at Vandenberg Air Force Base in Lompoc, California, United States.

Principal researchers who studied both the VLF and electron density data included Dr. M. P. Aubry of CNET, Dr. C. Renard, and Dr. Storey. Aubry published his results in 1968, while Storey published initial findings in 1967 before the mission's ultimate end. Northern Irish physicist James Sayers—an electron density expert—was also involved in the electron density experiments.

Data collected by FR-1 helped prove the existence of the plasmasphere, a thin layer between the ionosphere and magnetosphere. Prior to their work on FR-1 both Aubry and Storey had studied whistlers, VLF radio waves caused by lightning strikes, as they relate to the plasmasphere. From earlier whistler research Storey had deduced but was unable to conclusively prove the existence of the plasmasphere. In 1963 American scientist Don Carpenter and Soviet astronomer Konstantin Gringauz experimentally proved the plasmasphere and plasmapause's existence, building on Storey's thinking. Aubry and Storey's post-1965 studies of FR-1 VLF and electron density data further corroborated this: VLF waves in the ionosphere occasionally passed through a thin layer of plasma into the magnetosphere, normal to the direction of Earth's magnetic field. Throughout the 1970s, Storey continued studying VLF waves using data gathered by FR-1.

== Legacy and status ==
CNES scientists had posited vestigial radiation from American exoatmospheric nuclear testing would destroy FR-1's solar cells and sever communications three to four months after launch, with orbit lasting a few years. In fact, FR-1's VLF receiver operated until 26 August 1968, ending data collection and therefore the spacecraft's usefulness, but far exceeding the planned three-to-four-month research period. All telemetry with the satellite was lost on 28 February 1969. FR-1 remains in orbit as of 2023.

The Musée de l'air et de l'espace in Paris Le Bourget displays a cutaway replica of the satellite.

== See also ==
- Astérix
- French space program
- Timeline of artificial satellites and space probes
