= Llewelyn Robert Owen Storey =

British-French physicist and electrical engineer

Llewelyn Robert Owen Storey (born 5 November 1927; also known as L. R. O. Storey, L. R. Owen Storey, and Owen Storey) is a British physicist and electrical engineer who has worked and lived most of his adult life in France. He is known for his research on the Earth's atmosphere, especially whistlers—very low frequency (VLF) radio waves caused by lightning strikes—and the magnetosphere. He was the first person to prove whistlers are caused by lightning strikes and to deduce the plasmasphere's existence. He was heavily involved in designing scientific instruments for FR-1, a 1965 French-American satellite, and subsequent studies and experiments using data FR-1 collected.

== Early life ==
Storey was born on 5 November 1927 in Crowborough, England, United Kingdom. He received a Bachelor of Arts degree in natural sciences in 1948 and a PhD in physics in 1953, both from the University of Cambridge. He became interested in whistlers during his time as a graduate student. In fact, Storey in his 1953 PhD dissertation was the first person to realize the propagation of VLF radio waves after lightning strikes causes whistlers. Around the same time, Storey had posited the existence of whistlers meant plasma was present in Earth's atmosphere, and that it moved radio waves in the same direction as Earth's magnetic field lines. From this he deduced but was unable to conclusively prove the existence of the plasmasphere, a region of cold plasma extending from the upper ionosphere far into the magnetosphere.

After obtaining his doctorate, Storey worked in England, and then Canada and the United States, before becoming an employee of the French National Centre for Scientific Research (Centre national de la recherche scientifique; CNRS) in 1959.

== Career and research ==
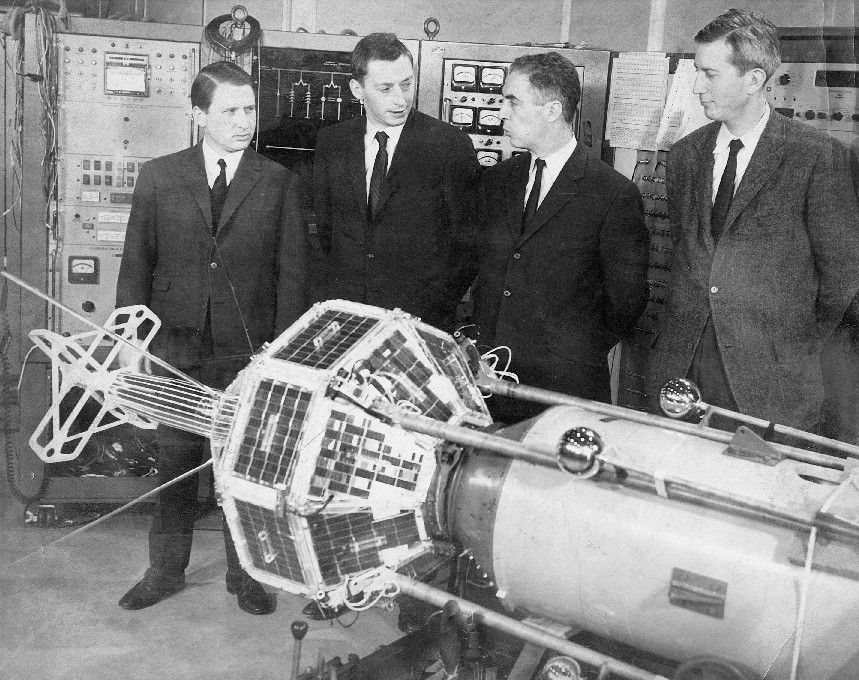
FR-1 mounted on a Scout rocket prior to launch in 1965; from left to right, C. Fayard, X. Namy, J. P. Causse, and L. R. O. Storey

=== FR-1: whistlers and the plasmasphere ===
In 1963 Storey became scientific director of the joint French-American FR-1 satellite program. He specified the satellite's scientific instruments, working in concert with Dr. Robert W. Rochelle and Sam Stevens of NASA's Goddard Space Flight Center (GSFC).

FR-1 was launched on 6 December 1965. The mission objective was to study the composition and structure of the ionosphere, plasmasphere, and magnetosphere by measuring the propagation of VLF waves and the local electron density of plasma in those atmospheric layers. For the VLF wave experiments, stations located on land in Seine-Port, France (at the Sainte-Assise transmitter), and Balboa, Panama, transmitted signals at 16.8 kHz and 24 kHz, respectively, while the satellite's magnetic and electric sensors orbiting about 750 kilometres (470 mi) away analyzed the magnetic field of the received wave.

Principal researchers who studied both the VLF and electron density data collected by FR-1 included Storey, as well as the French scientists Dr. M. P. Aubry of CNET and Dr. C. Renard. Aubry published his results in 1968, while Storey published initial findings in 1967 before the mission's ultimate end. Northern Irish physicist James Sayers—an electron density expert—was also involved in the electron density experiments.

Data collected by FR-1 helped prove the existence of the plasmasphere. Prior to their work on FR-1, both Aubry and Storey had studied whistlers. From earlier whistler research Storey deduced the existence of the plasmasphere but was unable to conclusively prove it. In 1963 American scientist Don Carpenter and Soviet astronomer Konstantin Gringauz—independently of each other, and the latter using data from the Luna 2 spacecraft—experimentally proved the plasmasphere and plasmapause's existence, building on Storey's thinking. Aubry and Storey's post-1965 studies of FR-1 VLF and electron density data further corroborated this: VLF waves in the ionosphere occasionally passed through a thin layer of plasma into the magnetosphere, normal to the direction of Earth's magnetic field.

=== Later career ===
After his work on FR-1, Storey headed his own research group which continued studying VLF waves using data gathered the satellite. It transferred to a laboratory in Orléans from its original Paris location in the early 1970s. This group's research focused on developing methods for measuring the properties of space plasmas using dipole antennas, and wave distribution function (WDF) analysis. For the plasma measurement research Storey and his group collaborated with West German and Swedish programs during the International Magnetospheric Study of 1976 to 1979, allowing them to carry out further experiments on rockets.

In 1983 Storey joined the research faculty of Stanford University's Electrical Engineering Department. From 1987 to 1989 he served as a senior visiting scientist at NASA Headquarters in Washington, D.C., and then as a WDF analysis software developer at NASA's Goddard Space Flight Center.

Storey retired in 1992. In 1997 he received the IEEE Heinrich Hertz Medal for his lifelong research on whistlers.

== Personal life ==
Storey is a member of the American Geophysical Union. He and his wife live in southern France; they have three children together.

== See also ==
- French space program
