= Whistler (radio) =

Very low frequency EM waves generated by lightning

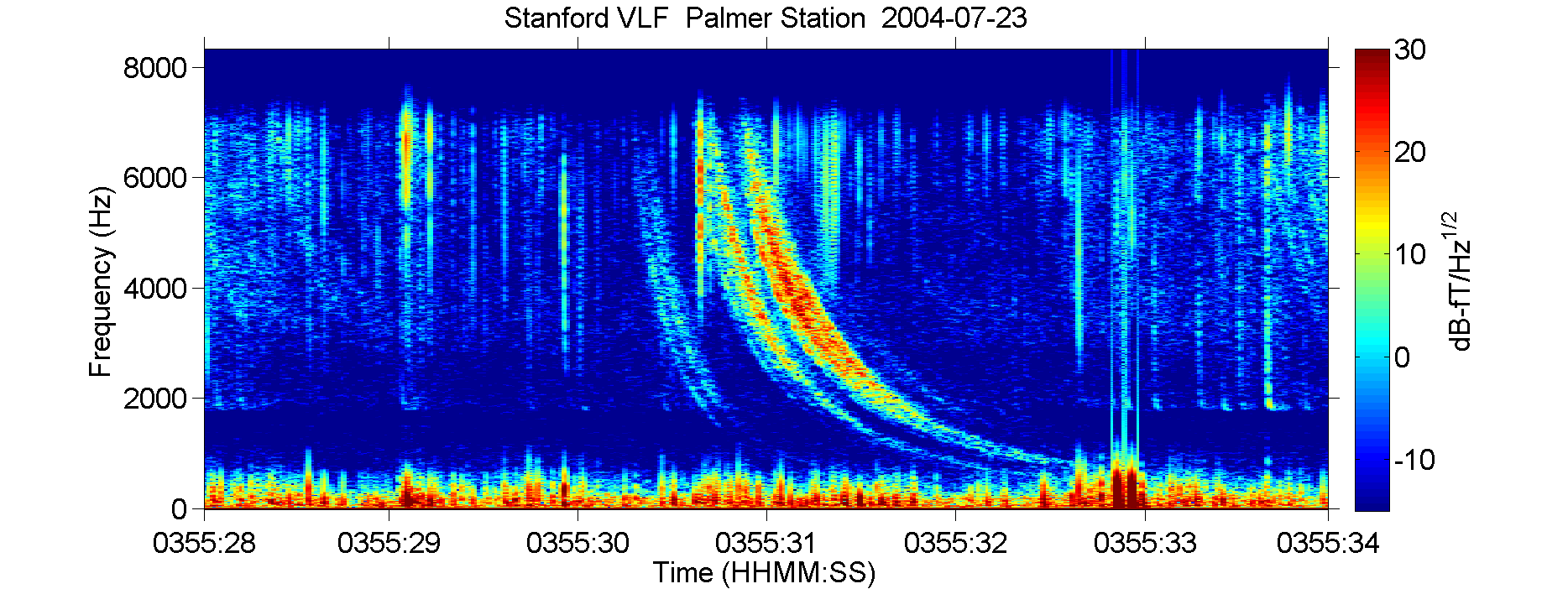
VLF spectrogram of an electromagnetic whistler wave, as received by the Stanford University VLF group's wave receiver at Palmer Station, Antarctica.

A whistler is a very low frequency (VLF) electromagnetic (radio) wave generated by lightning. Frequencies of terrestrial whistlers are 1 kHz to 30 kHz, with maximum frequencies usually at 3 kHz to 5 kHz. Although they are electromagnetic waves, they occur at audio frequencies, and can be converted to audio using a suitable receiver. They are produced by lightning strikes (mostly intracloud and return-path) where the impulse travels along the Earth's magnetic field lines from one hemisphere to the other. They undergo dispersion of several kHz due to the slower velocity of the lower frequencies through the plasma environments of the ionosphere and magnetosphere. Thus they are perceived as a descending tone which can last for a few seconds. The study of whistlers categorizes them into Pure Note, Diffuse, 2-Hop, and Echo Train types.

Voyager 1 and 2 spacecraft detected whistler-like activity in the vicinity of Jupiter known as "Jovian Whistlers", supporting the visual observations of lightning made by Voyager 1.

Whistlers have been detected in the Earth's magnetosheath, where they are often called “lion roars” due to their frequencies of tens to hundreds of Hz.

== Sources ==
The pulse of electromagnetic energy of a lightning discharge producing whistlers contains a wide range of frequencies below the electron cyclotron frequency. Due to interactions with free electrons in the ionosphere, the waves becomes highly dispersive and like guided waves, follow the lines of geomagnetic field. These lines provide the field with sufficient focusing influence and prevents the scattering of field energy. Their paths reach into the outer space as far as 3 to 4 times the Earth's radius in the plane of equator and bring energy from lightning discharge to the Earth at a point in the opposite hemisphere which is the magnetic conjugate of the position of radio emission for whistlers. From there, the whistler waves are reflected back to the hemisphere from which they started. The energy is almost perfectly reflected from earth surface 4 or 5 times with increase dispersion and diminishing amplitude. Along such long paths the speed of propagation of energy is between c/10 to c/100 (where c is the speed of light) and the exact value depends upon frequency.

Modulated heating of the lower ionosphere with an HF heater array can also be used to generate VLF waves that excite whistler mode propagation. By transmitting high power HF waves with a VLF modulated power envelope into the D-region ionosphere, the conductivity of the ionospheric plasma can be modulated. This conductivity modulation together with naturally occurring electrojet fields produces a virtual antenna which radiates at the modulation frequency. The HAARP HF heater array has been used to excite whistler-mode VLF signals detectable at the magnetic conjugate point, with up to 10 hops visible in the received VLF data.

== History ==
Whistlers were probably heard as early as 1886 on long telephone lines, but the clearest early description was by Heinrich Barkhausen in 1919. British scientist Llewelyn Robert Owen Storey had shown lightning generated whistlers in his 1953 PhD dissertation. Around the same time, Storey had posited the existence of whistlers meant plasma was present in Earth's atmosphere, and that it moved radio waves in the same direction as Earth's magnetic field lines. From this he deduced but was unable to conclusively prove the existence of the plasmasphere, a thin layer between the ionosphere and magnetosphere. In 1963 American scientist Don Carpenter and Soviet astronomer Konstantin Gringauz—independently of each other, and the latter using data from the Luna 2 spacecraft—experimentally proved the plasmasphere and plasmapause's existence, building on Storey's thinking.

American electrical engineer Robert Helliwell is also known for his research into whistlers. Helliwell and one of his students, Jack Mallinckrodt, were investigating lightning noise at very low radio frequencies at Stanford University in 1950. Mallinckrodt heard some whistling sounds and brought them to Helliwell's attention. As Helliwell recalled in an article in the October 1982 issue of the Stanford Engineer, he initially thought it was an artifact, but stood radio watch with Mallinckrodt until he heard the whistlers himself. Helliwell described these sounds as "weird, strange and unbelievable as flying saucers" in a 1954 article in the Palo Alto Times. Helliwell tried to understand the mechanism involved in the production of whistlers. He conducted experiments at the VLF outpost Siple Station in West Antarctica, which was active from 1971 to 1988. Since the wavelength of VLF radio signals is very large (a frequency of 10 kHz corresponds to a wavelength of 30 kilometres (19 mi)), Siple Station had an antenna that was 13 miles (21 km) long. The antenna was used to transmit VLF radio signals into Earth's magnetosphere, to be detected in Canada. It was possible to inject these signals into the magnetosphere, since the ionosphere is transparent to these low frequencies.

=== Etymology ===
Whistlers were named by British World War I radio operators. On the wide-band spectrogram, the observed characteristic of a whistler is that the tone rapidly descends over a few seconds—almost like a person whistling or an incoming grenade—hence the name "whistlers."

== Nomenclature ==
A type of electromagnetic signal propagating in the Earth–ionosphere waveguide, known as a radio atmospheric signal or sferic, may escape the ionosphere and propagate outward into the magnetosphere. The signal is prone to bounce-mode propagation, reflecting back and forth on opposite sides of the planet until totally attenuated. To clarify which part of this hop pattern the signal is in, it is specified by a number, indicating the portion of the bounce path it is currently on. On its first upward path, it is known as a 0^{+}. After passing the geomagnetic equator, it is referred to as a 1^{−}. The + or - sign indicates either upward or downward propagation, respectively. The numeral represents the half-bounce currently in progress. The reflected signal is redesignated 1^{+}, until passing the geomagnetic equator again; then it is called 2^{−}, and so on.

== See also ==
- Dawn chorus (electromagnetic)
- Electromagnetic electron wave
- Hiss (electromagnetic)
- Atmospheric noise
- Radio atmospheric
- Helicon (physics)

=== Relevant spacecraft ===
- Advanced Composition Explorer (ACE), launched 1997, still operational.
- FR-1, launched 1965, one of the earliest spacecraft to measure ionospheric and magnetospheric VLF waves, non-operational but still orbiting Earth.
- Helios (spacecraft)
- MESSENGER (MErcury Surface, Space ENvironment, GEochemistry and Ranging), launched 2004, decommissioned 2015.
- Radiation Belt Storm Probes
- Solar Dynamics Observatory (SDO), launched 2010, still operational.
- Solar and Heliospheric Observatory (SOHO), launched 1995, still operational.
- Solar Maximum Mission (SMM), launched 1980, decommissioned 1989.
- Solar Orbiter (SOLO), Launched in February 2020, Operational in November 2021.
- Parker Solar Probe, launched in 2018, still operational.
- STEREO (Solar TErrestrial RElations Observatory), launched 2006, still operational.
- Transition Region and Coronal Explorer (TRACE), launched 1998, decommissioned 2010.
- Ulysses (spacecraft), launched 1990, decommissioned 2009.
- WIND (spacecraft), launched 1994, still operational.
