= Auroral chorus =

Geomagnetic phenomenon

An auroral chorus is a series of electromagnetic waves at frequencies which resemble chirps, whistles, and quasi-musical sounds in predominantly rising tones when played as pressure waves (sound), which are created by geomagnetic storms also responsible for the auroras. The sounds last approximately 0.1 to 1.0 seconds. Other auroral sounds includes hissing, swishing, rustling and cracking.

The electromagnetic waves are a type of natural radio waves, vibrations of electric and magnetic energy occurring at the same frequency as sound.

== Detection ==
Auroral chorus can be detected primarily around the magnetic equator, specifically in two distinct frequency bands, one above the equatorial half gyro-frequency and one below it. The gyro-frequency ranges from 0.6 kHz to about 1.6 kHz. Distinguishable on high resolution wideband spectrographs, the wave amplitude grows linearly then switches to non-linear. Demonstrating a peak distribution near dawn, the auroral chorus is most detectable via ELF/VLF Radio receivers in the middle latitude around 30-60 degrees N. The most numerous recordings of the auroral chorus has been by the Iowa Plasma Wave Group. They have released many audio interpretations of chorus recordings online along with spectrograph measurements.

Historically, the sounds have been associated with spiritual events by Inuit in Canada who regularly experienced auroral chorus on cold, windless nights.

== Explanation ==
The specific nature and source of the auroral chorus is a continuing question in space and atmospheric research. Cluster satellite observations suggest that the sounds are seemingly generated by numerous sources in rapid motion.

Studies have shown a definite correlation on/off with fluctuations of solar wind and southward turning of interplanetary magnetic field (which is correlated with aurora). The strength of noise correlates with strength of geomagnetic activity in the Earth's ionosphere. Other studies show a clear correlation peak at upper infrasound range (less than 20 Hz). A delay between the peak of auroral sounds and the peak of electromagnetic activity, corresponds to the speed of sound as if it were traveling from the auroral heights (80–100 km) to the Earth's surface. However, local electric field signals do not correlate well with sound signals.

Some believe that it is probable that the auroral chorus doesn't originate at the point of aurorae but rather is transformed from slight wave ripples in the air into audible sound waves by objects closer to the observer. There remains a question of whether real sound waves exist or if somehow electromagnetic waves affects the human ear.

== See also ==
- Dawn chorus (electromagnetic)
- Aurora
- Geomagnetic storm
- Radio waves in the Ionosphere
