= Compact intracloud discharge =

Intensive form of lightning that produces radio waves and scarce visible light

A compact intracloud discharge (CID), also known as a narrow bipolar event (NBE) or narrow bipolar pulse (NBP) is an intensive form of lightning that produces radio waves and scarce visible light. Lasting only a few millionths of a second (typically 20 us), these events are the most powerful known natural terrestrial source of radio waves in HF and VHF band. They are not well understood scientifically.

== See also ==
- Whistler (radio)
