= Sainte-Assise transmitter =

Radio transmitter in France

Coordinates: 48°32′41.10″N 2°34′34.10″E

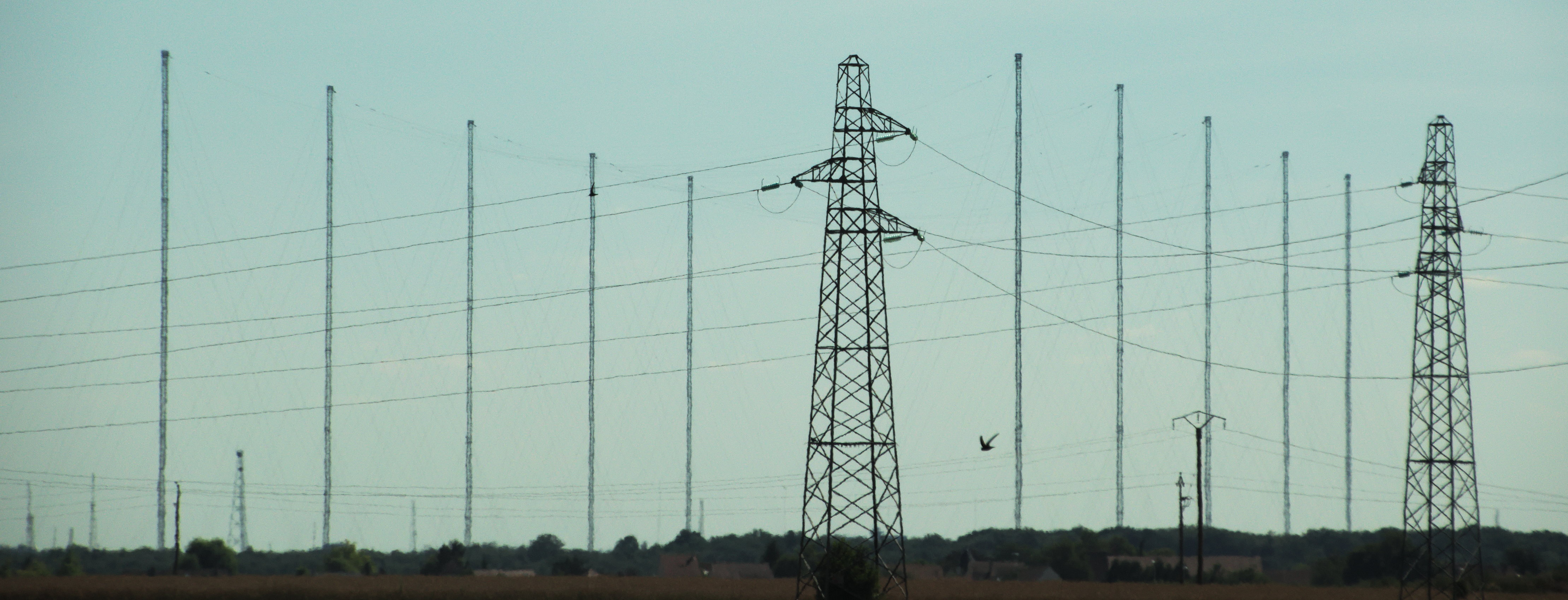
Sainte-Assise transmitter seen from the A6 autoroute

The Sainte-Assise transmitter (French: Émetteur de Sainte-Assise) is a very low frequency (VLF) radio transmitter and military installation located on the grounds of the Château de Sainte-Assise in the communes of Seine-Port, Boissise-la-Bertrand, and Cesson in the Seine-et-Marne department of the Île-de-France region of France. The transmitter's original equipment was inaugurated on 9 January 1921, at the time being the most powerful radio transmitter on Earth. On 26 November 1921 the first French radio program was transmitted from Sainte-Assise. In 1965 the transmitter was used to send VLF signals to FR-1, the first French satellite. Since 1998 the French Navy has used the transmitter to communicate with submerged submarines.

== Design ==
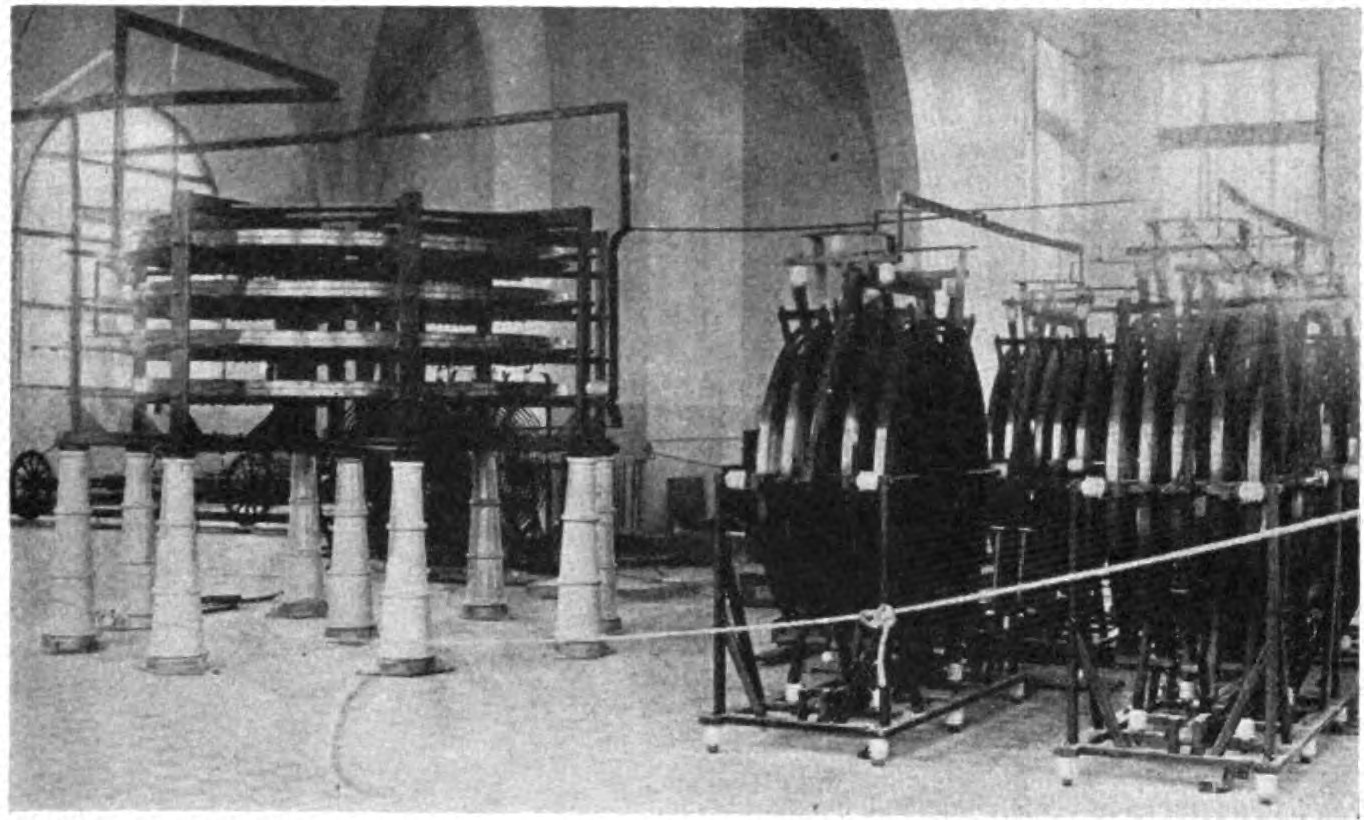
Spiral inductors used for the transmitter in 1922

The original equipment of the Sainte-Assise transmitter included large spiral "pancake" inductors in a high-power longwave alternator transmitter which served as a transatlantic wireless telegraphy station. These combinations of inductors and alternator transmitters were called "oscillation transformers." The primary coil was connected to a large rotating radio frequency alternator which produced the radio signal. The secondary coil was connected to the overhead wire aerial system, over 1 mile (1.6 km) long, supported on sixteen 850-foot (260 m) high towers, which radiated the radio waves. The inductance of the secondary coil resonated with the capacitance of the antenna to form the tank circuit of the transmitter in order to control the output frequency. It transmitted on a wavelength of 14,300 metres (46,900 ft), or 21 kHz. The station had two 500 kW Alexanderson alternator transmitters and two 250 kW alternator transmitters. The station's transmitters were designed to handle telegram traffic at a rate of 100 words per minute, and all six of them had a combined capacity of 36,000 words per hour.

The spiral shape of the coils reduced resistive losses at radio frequency due to proximity effect. The copper conductors are made in the form of wide strips to increase their surface area in order to reduce their resistance at radio frequencies, since radio frequency currents flow along the surface of conductors due to skin effect.

== History ==
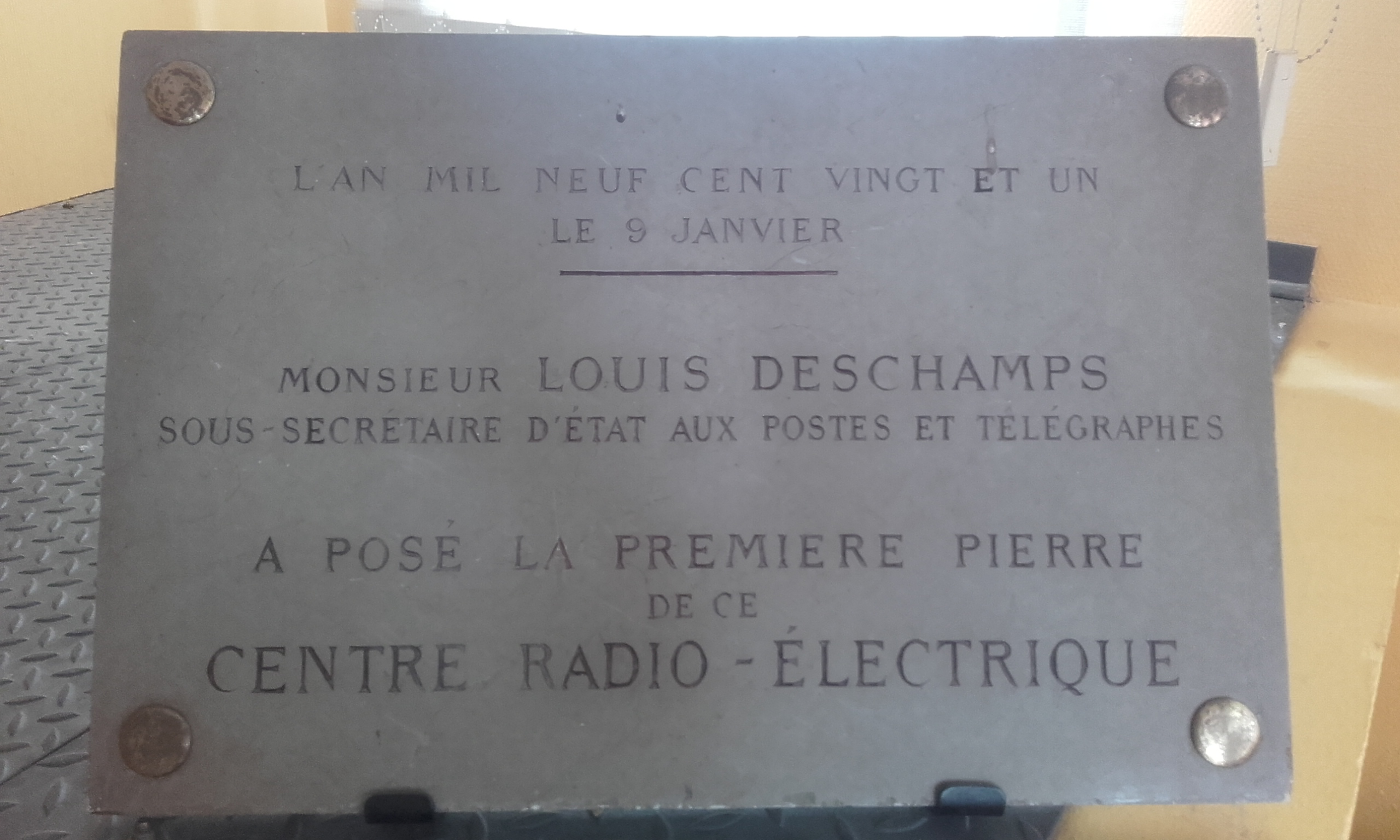
Commemorative plaque of the 1921 inauguration of the Sainte-Assise transmitter by Louis Deschamps, then French Deputy Secretary of State for Post and Telegraphs

The Compagnie Radio France, a subsidiary of Compagnie générale de la télégraphie sans fil (CSF), built the Saint-Assise transmitter. The first antenna at Saint-Assise was supported by eleven 250-metre (820 ft) pylons and five 180-metre (590 ft) masts. When it opened on 9 January 1921, the transmitter was the most powerful on Earth, capable of broadcasting to the entire planet.

On 26 November 1921 the first experimental French radio program was transmitted from Sainte-Assise using a 1 kW-long wave transmitter. As part of the broadcast, opera singer Yvonne Brothier performed La Marseillaise, a song from Mireille, and an aria from The Barber of Seville. Subsequently, the site was a center of early French experiments with television.

In 1941, during World War II, the Kriegsmarine requisitioned Sainte-Assise to allow communications between Berlin and U-boats. Despite this, Sainte-Assise was not targeted or damaged by Allied bombing and all of the antennas survived the war.

The Saint-Assise transmitter played a key role in the 1965 launch of FR-1, the first French satellite. FR-1's mission objective was to study the composition and structure of the ionosphere, plasmasphere, and magnetosphere by measuring the propagation of VLF waves and the local electron density of plasma in those atmospheric layers. For the VLF wave experiments, the Sainte-Assise transmitter and another ground station in Balboa, Panama, transmitted signals at 16.8 kHz and 24 kHz, respectively, while the satellite's magnetic and electric sensors orbiting about 750 kilometres (470 mi) away analyzed the magnetic field of the received wave.

In 1991 part of the station was sold by France Télécom to the French Navy, to become the Sainte-Assise Marine Communications Center (French: Centre de transmissions marine; CTM). The CTM, inaugurated in 1998, is tasked with communicating with submerged submarines. An entire company of Fusiliers marins patrols the grounds.

In December 2000 three unused 180-meter pylons were dismantled.

Globecast, an Orange S.A. subsidiary, owns and operates the Sainte-Assise teleport (located on a second site near the Saint-Assise transmitter) which supports multiple parabolic satellite dishes measuring between 4 metres (13 ft) and 16 metres (52 ft) in diameter. This station ensures the transmission of up-link signals to communications satellites, in particular video and audio signals for the direct broadcasting of satellite radio and television.

== See also ==
- HWU transmitter
