= Atmospheric noise =

Noise generated by an atmosphere

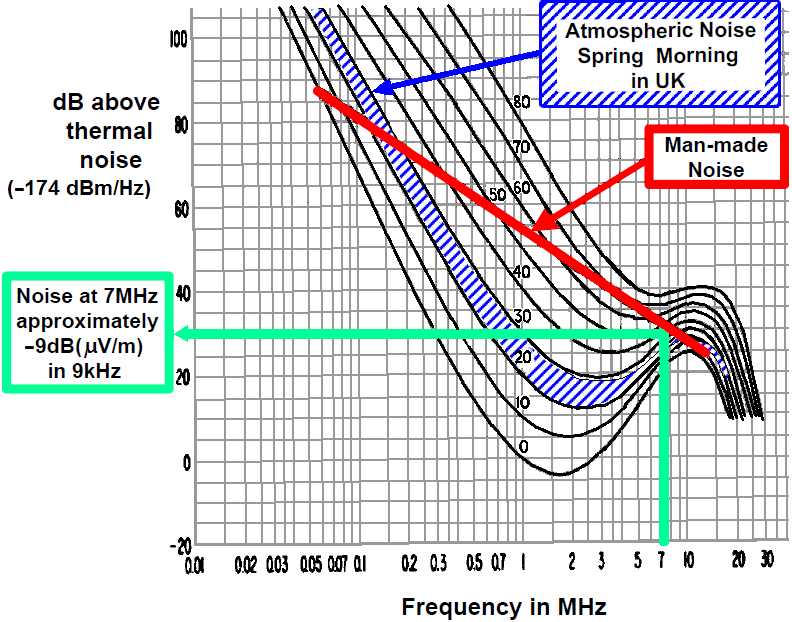
CCIR 322 atmospheric noise relationship. The standard has tables and maps that determine the noise figure at 1 MHz according to the season and the time of day. This graph converts that noise figure to other frequencies. Notice that the plotted lines are spaced in 10 dB increments at 1 MHz.

Atmospheric noise is radio noise, or "static", caused by natural atmospheric processes, primarily lightning discharges in thunderstorms. On a worldwide scale, there are about 40 lightning flashes per second, or ≈ 3.5 million lightning discharges per day.

== Lightning ==
Atmospheric noise is radio noise caused by natural atmospheric processes, primarily lightning discharges in thunderstorms. It is mainly caused by cloud-to-ground flashes as the current is much stronger than that of cloud-to-cloud flashes. On a worldwide scale, 3.5 million lightning flashes occur daily. That means there are about 40 lightning flashes per second.

The sum of all these lightning flashes results in atmospheric noise. It can be easily heard with any AM radio or SSB receiver tuned to an unused frequency. The static heard is a combination of white noise (cumulative of distant thunderstorms) and impulse noise (from relatively nearby thunderstorms, if any). The power-sum of this noise varies with seasons and nearness of thunderstorm centers. It can be seen as random speckles on an old analog TV set dialed to an empty channel.

Although lightning has a broad-spectrum emission, its noise power increases with decreasing frequency. Therefore, at very low frequency and low frequency, atmospheric noise often dominates, while at high frequency, man-made noise dominates in urban areas.

== History ==
=== Early investigation and study ===
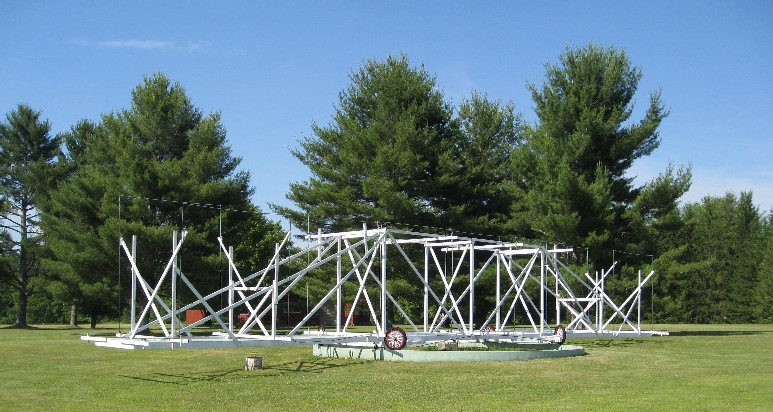
A replica of Jansky's radio telescope at the National Radio Astronomy Observatory.38.431659°N 79.816253°W

In 1925, AT&T Bell Laboratories started investigating the sources of noise in its transatlantic radio telephone service.

Then a 22 year-old researcher, K.G. Jansky undertook the task in 1928. By 1930, a radio antenna for a wavelength of 14.6 meters was constructed in Holmdel, NJ, to measure the noise in all directions. Jansky recognized three sources of radio noise:

1. The first (and strongest) source was local thunderstorms.
2. The second source was weaker noise from more distant thunderstorms.
3. The third source was a still weaker hiss that turned out to be galactic noise from the center of the Milky Way.

Jansky's research made him the "father of radio astronomy".

In early 1950s, S.V.C. Aiya published a mathematical model of the cumulative effects of lightning and thunderstorms on broadcasting.

=== Later survey data ===
From 1960s to 1980s, a worldwide effort was made to measure the atmospheric noise and variations. Results have been documented in CCIR Report 322. CCIR 322 provided seasonal world maps showing the expected values of the atmospheric noise figure F_{a} at 1 MHz during four hour blocks of the day. Another set of charts relates the F_{a} at 1 MHz to other frequencies. CCIR Report 322 has been superseded by publication of ITU R-RE-P.372.

== Random number generation ==
Atmospheric noise and variation is also used to generate high quality random numbers. Unlike pseudorandom number generators (PRNGs), which use algorithms and are inherently deterministic, true random number generators (TRNGs) can derive randomness from physical phenomena.

RANDOM.ORG leverages atmospheric noise to generate truly random numbers. It captures atmospheric noise using radios and translates the variations in the amplitude of this noise into a stream of random numbers. Unlike PRNGs, which rely on mathematical formulas, the numbers generated through atmospheric noise are not predetermined.

=== Applications ===
- Cryptography: True random numbers are essential for generating secure encryption keys.
- Statistical sampling: Ensures unbiased sampling in surveys and experiments.
- Simulations: Used in Monte Carlo simulations to model complex systems and processes.

=== Predictability ===
One challenge in using atmospheric noise for random number generation is the deterministic nature of the universe. Some argue that if we could perfectly understand and measure all the factors influencing atmospheric noise, it might become predictable. However, the complexity of weather systems and the difficulty in measuring variables like the position and velocity of every molecule make it practically impossible to predict these numbers. For this reason, even if atmospheric noise is theoretically predictable, it is practically unpredictable, making it useful for generating random numbers.

== See also ==
- radio atmospheric
- radio interference
- radio noise
