= S. V. C. Aiya =

S. V. Chandrashekhar Aiya
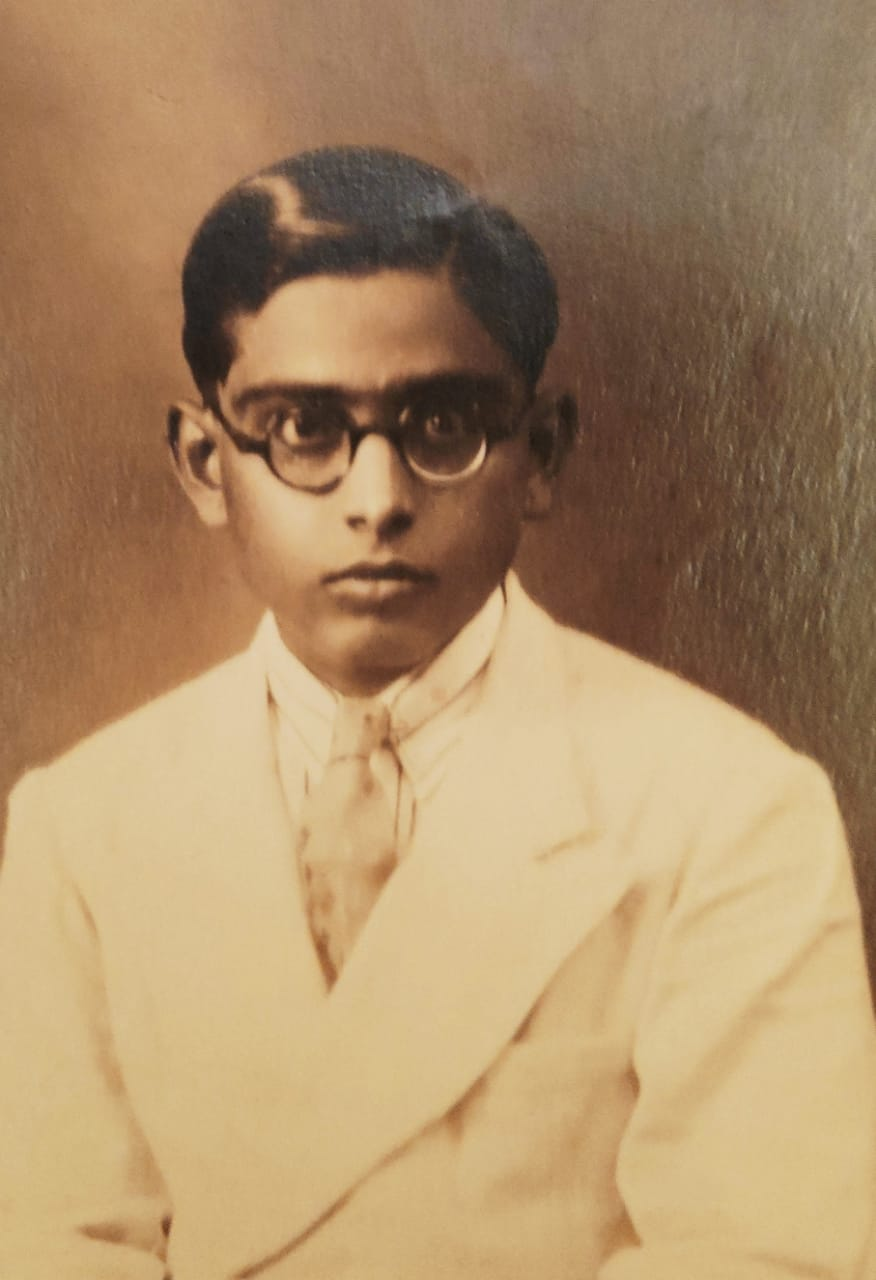
- Prof S. V. C. Aiya in Cambridge
- Born: 6 March 1911; Mysore, Mysore State, British India
- Died: 15 June 1992 (aged 81); New Jersey, United States
- Education: Caius College, Cambridge
- Known for: Research on Atmospheric Noise; Engineering Education
- Spouse: Meenakshi Belavady
- Children: Jagadish C. Aiya; Leela S. Rao
- Scientific career
- Fields: Meteorology; Electrical & Telecommunications Engineering

S.V. Chandrashekhar Aiya (1911–1992) was an Indian scientist and engineer who mathematically demonstrated the effect of thunderstorms and lightning on television and radio broadcasting signals (RF signals).

He was the second Chairman of the Department of Electrical and Communications Engineering in the Indian Institute of Science (1959-1969). The S.V.C. Aiya award is named after him. He was also the first full time director of the National Council of Educational Research and Training.

== Personal life and education ==
S. V. Chandrashekhar Aiya was born in 1911. His father, S. Vishkant Aiya, was a lawyer in service with the Maharaja of Mysore. He relocated with his family to what is now the Maharashtra region when Professor Aiya was still young.

He completed his early schooling in the Esplande High School in Bombay, earned his degree from Wilson College and completed his master's degree at Caius College, Cambridge.

He was married to Meenakshi Belavady, the sister of Dr. Bhavani Belavady. Dr. Bhavani was an Indian nutrition researcher. The novelist S. L. Bhyrappa described his exchanges with S.V.C Aiya in his autobiography Bhitti. In his book, S. L. Bhyrappa recounts his positive interactions with the professor and his wife, during a time when the novelist was also employed with NCERT.

== Career ==
He is credited with starting the BE, ME and PhD programs at the College of Engineering, Poona (COEP) and setting up electronics and telecommunications engineering laboratories from scratch. COEP is the third oldest engineering college in Asia and was the only Engineering college in Pune at the time. Aiya also acted as the Dean in the Universities of Bombay, Poona and Ahmedabad.

He was the second chairman (1959-1969) of the department of Electrical and Communications Engineering in the Indian Institute of Science. The bust of Heinrich Hertz installed at the entrance of the Department is said to have been gifted by the Govt. of West Germany during his tenure.

The Indian Institute of Science's first PhD was granted to Aiya's student BS Sonde. Dr. Sonde went on to become the Chairman of the Department in 1981.

He was also the first full time director of NCERT in Delhi, contributing to the education of a renewed India.

== Positions held ==
- Member of the Bombay Education Service Class 1
- Chairman Department of Electrical Communications Engineering IISC, Bangalore
- Director of the NCERT
- Distinguished Fellow and President of the Institution of Electronics and Telecommunication Engineers, New Delhi (1959–60)
- Fellow of the Institution of Engineers India; Fellow of the Institution of Electrical Engineers, London (Now merged with Institution of Engineering and technology); Honorary Fellow of the National Academy of Sciences, India
- Served on several committees of the Government of India and the Government of Bombay

== Research ==
In the early 1950s, Professor Aiya developed a mathematical model that showed how thunderstorms and lightning impacted radio and TV broadcasting. He gave lectures on lightning and radio noise in several international Universities and research establishments.

He also collaborated with Homi J. Bhabha (his fellow alumnus from Cambridge) co-authoring 3 research publications with him between 1945 and 1946. During this period, he also helped Dr. Bhabha in creating a cost effective Geiger counter telescope and a GM telescope necessary for conducting his research

Aiya's areas of interest included technological forecasting, tropicalization and design enhancements. He was also interested in education (including engineering education) and is said to have written extensively on the subject.

== See also ==
- Atmospheric noise
