= Cluster One =

Instrumental by Pink Floyd

from the album The Division Bell
- Released: 28 March 1994
- Recorded: 1993
- Genre: Progressive rock; instrumental rock; ambient; new age
- Length: 5:58
- Label: EMI (UK); Columbia (US)
- Songwriters: David Gilmour; Richard Wright
- Producers: Bob Ezrin; David Gilmour

"Cluster One", an instrumental, is the opening track on Pink Floyd's 1994 album The Division Bell.

== History ==
It is the first Pink Floyd collaboration between Richard Wright and David Gilmour since "Mudmen", from the 1972 album Obscured by Clouds.

The piece has never been performed live by the band, although portions of it were included in the sound collage tape played before their 1994 concerts.

== Track overture ==
The noise which opens the track caused some confusion among fans in 1994, who were unsure, on playing the album for the first time, whether or not their copy was faulty, as the noise lasts for just over 1 minute before any music begins. According to an interview with Andy Jackson, recording engineer for the album, this noise is electromagnetic noise from the solar wind. More precisely, this sound is a very low frequency record of dawn chorus and sferics, radio events respectively due to solar wind interference with Earth's magnetosphere, and lightning strikes radio emissions interfering with Ionosphere; this sound has been mistaken for Earth's crust shifting and cracking.

== Personnel ==
- David Gilmour – guitars
- Nick Mason – drums, percussion
- Richard Wright – piano, Kurzweil synthesizers, Hammond organ
