= Alfvén resonator =

An Alfvén resonator or Ionosphere Alfvén resonator is a spectral resonance structure found within geomagnetic fields in the frequency range of 0.1–10 Hz. First reported in 1989, they are ionospheric short-period geomagnetic variations primarily seen as nighttime phenomena and rarely observed during the day. The nighttime preference is due to lower electrical conductivity in the ionospheric dynamo region, which enables the feedback instability.

== See also ==
- Earth–ionosphere waveguide
