= Dawn chorus (electromagnetic) =

Electromagnetic wave phenomenon

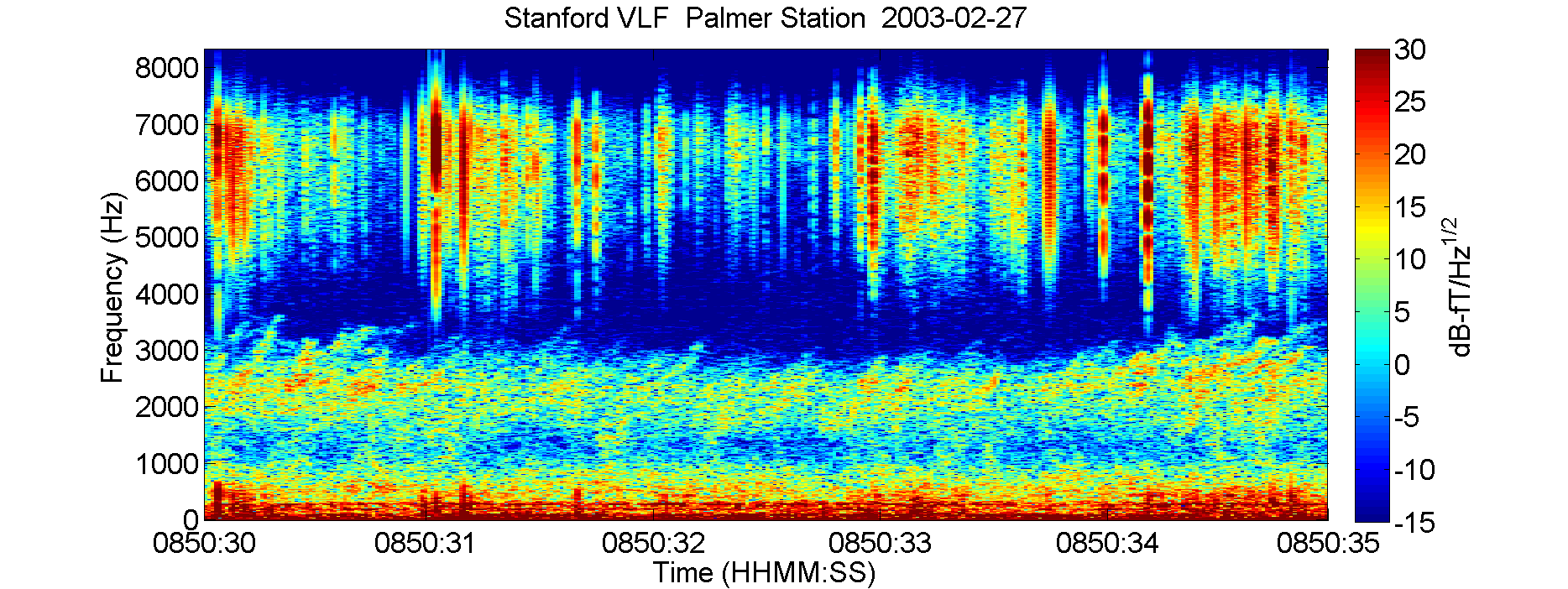
VLF spectrogram of electromagnetic chorus, as received by the Stanford University VLF group's wave receiver at Palmer Station, Antarctica. The chorus can be seen between 1000 Hz and 3000 Hz, sandwiched between components of sferics

The electromagnetic dawn chorus is a phenomenon that occurs most often at or shortly after dawn local time. It is believed to be generated by a Doppler-shifted cyclotron interaction between anisotropic distributions of energetic (> 40 keV) electrons and ambient background VLF noise. These energetic electrons are generally injected into the inner magnetosphere at the onset of the substorm expansion phase. Dawn choruses occur more frequently during magnetic storms.

This phenomenon also occurs during aurorae, when it is termed an auroral chorus.

With the proper radio equipment, dawn chorus can be converted to sounds that resemble, coincidentally, birds' dawn chorus.

== See also ==
- Auroral chorus
- Dawn chorus (birds)
- Hiss (electromagnetic)
- Whistler (radio)
- "Cluster One," a Pink Floyd track using sferics and dawn chorus as an overture
