= Earth–ionosphere waveguide =

Physical phenomenon

The Earth–ionosphere waveguide is the phenomenon in which certain radio waves can propagate in the space between the ground and the boundary of the ionosphere. Because the ionosphere contains charged particles, it can behave as a conductor. The earth operates as a ground plane, and the resulting cavity behaves as a large waveguide.

Extremely low frequency (ELF) (< 3 kHz) and very low frequency (VLF) (3–30 kHz) signals can propagate efficiently in this waveguide. For instance, lightning strikes launch a signal called radio atmospherics, which can travel many thousands of kilometers, because they are confined between the Earth and the ionosphere. The round-the-world nature of the waveguide produces resonances, like a cavity, which are at ~7 Hz.

== Introduction ==
Earth–ionosphere waveguide

Figure 1. Geometry of ray propagation within the Earth–ionosphere waveguide. The ground wave and two sky waves are displayed

Figure 2. Real and virtual reflection height

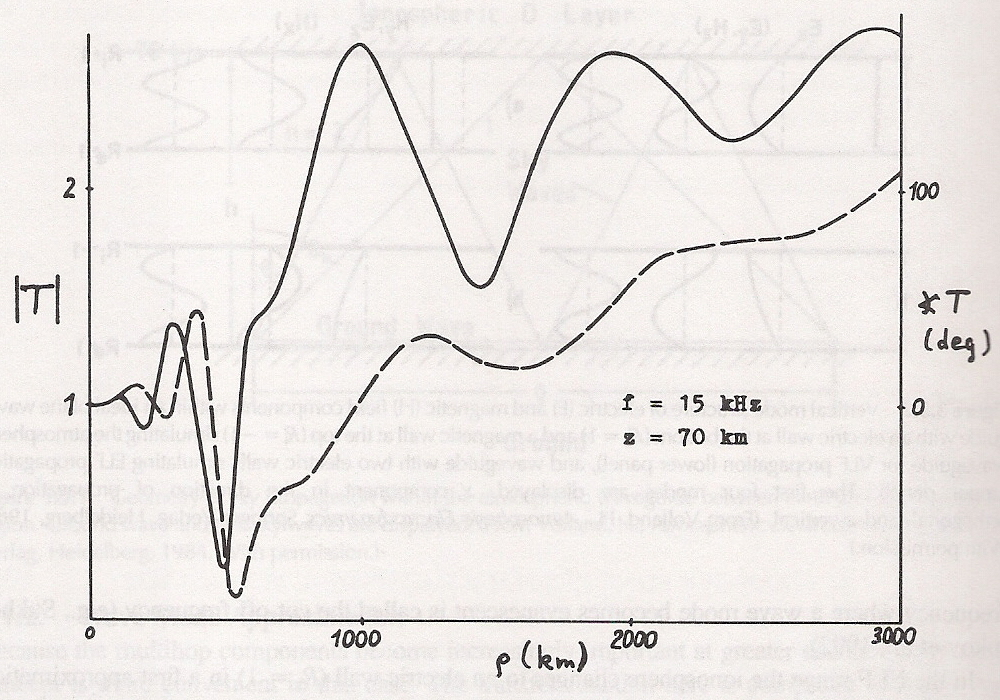
Figure 3. Normalized vertical field strength E_{z} vs. distance ρ in magnitude (solid line, left ordinate) and phase (dashed line, right ordinate). (Note: The transmitter is a vertical electric Hertzian dipole radiating at 15 kHz. The virtual reflection height of the Earth-ionosphere waveguide is at 70 km, corresponding to day time conditions at mid-latitudes. The amplitude minimum near ρ = 500 is the last interference minimum between ground wave and first sky wave (ray theory). It is also the first interference minimum between first and second mode (mode theory))

Figure 4. Magnitude of transfer functions of the zeroth mode and the first mode versus frequency at distances 1000, 3000, and 10000 km using day time conditions.

Radio propagation within the ionosphere depends on frequency, angle of incidence, time of day, season, Earth's magnetic field, and solar activity. At vertical incidence, waves with frequencies larger than the electron plasma frequency ($f_e$ in Hz) of the F-layer maximum

$f_e = 9\sqrt{N_e}$	1

($N_e$ in $m^{-3}$ is the electron density) can propagate through the ionosphere nearly undisturbed. Waves with frequencies smaller than $f_e$ are reflected within the ionospheric D-, E-, and F-layers. $f_e$ is of the order of 8–15 MHz during day time conditions. For oblique incidence, the critical frequency becomes larger.

Very low frequencies (VLF: 3–30 kHz), and extremely low frequencies (ELF: <3 kHz) are reflected at the ionospheric D- and lower E-layer. An exception is whistler propagation of lightning signals along the geomagnetic field lines.

The wavelengths of VLF waves (10–100 km) are already comparable with the height of the ionospheric D-layer (about 70 km during the day, and 90 km during the night). Therefore, ray theory is only applicable for propagation over short distances, while mode theory must be used for larger distances. The region between Earth's surface and the ionospheric D-layer behaves thus like a waveguide for VLF- and ELF-waves.

In the presence of the ionospheric plasma and the geomagnetic field, electromagnetic waves exist for frequencies which are larger than the gyrofrequency of the ions (about 1 Hz). Waves with frequencies smaller than the gyrofrequency are called hydromagnetic waves. The geomagnetic pulsations with periods of seconds to minutes as well as Alfvén waves belong to that type of waves.

== Transfer function ==
The prototype of a short vertical rod antenna is a vertical electric Hertz dipole in which electric alternating currents of frequency f flow. Its radiation of electromagnetic waves within the Earth-ionospheric waveguide can be described by a transfer function T(ρ,ω):

$E_z(\rho,\omega) = T(\rho,\omega) E_o(\rho,\omega)$	2

where E_{z} is the vertical component of the electric field at the receiver in a distance ρ from the transmitter, E_{o} is the electric field of a Hertzian dipole in free space, and $\omega = 2\pi f$ the angular frequency. In free space, it is $T = 1$. Evidently, the Earth–ionosphere waveguide is dispersive because the transfer function depends on frequency. This means that phase- and group velocity of the waves are frequency dependent.

== Ray theory ==
In the VLF range, the transfer function is the sum of a ground wave which arrives directly at the receiver and multihop sky waves reflected at the ionospheric D-layer (Figure 1).

For the real Earth's surface, the ground wave becomes dissipated and depends on the orography along the ray path. For VLF waves at shorter distances, this effect is, however, of minor importance, and the reflection factor of the Earth is $R_e = 1$, in a first approximation.

At shorter distances, only the first hop sky wave is of importance. The D-layer can be simulated by a magnetic wall ($R_i = -1$) with a fixed boundary at a virtual height h, which means a phase jump of 180° at the reflection point. In reality, the electron density of the D-layer increases with altitude, and the wave is bounded as shown in Figure 2.

The sum of ground wave and first hop wave displays an interference pattern with interference minima if the difference between the ray paths of ground and first sky wave is half a wavelength (or a phase difference of 180°). The last interference minimum on the ground (z = 0) between the ground wave and the first sky wave is at a horizontal distance of

$\rho_1 \approx \dfrac{2fh^2}{c}$	3

with c the velocity of light. In the example of Figure 3, this is at about 500 km distance.

== Wave mode theory ==
The theory of ray propagation of VLF waves breaks down at larger distances because in the sum of these waves successive multihop sky waves are involved, and the sum diverges. In addition, it becomes necessary to take into account the spherical Earth. Mode theory which is the sum of eigen-modes in the Earth–ionosphere waveguide is valid in this range of distances. The wave modes have fixed vertical structures of their vertical electric field components with maximum amplitudes at the bottom and zero amplitudes at the top of the waveguide. In the case of the fundamental first mode, it is a quarter wavelength. With decreasing frequency, the eigenvalue becomes imaginary at the cutoff frequency, where the mode changes to an evanescent wave. For the first mode, this happens at

$f_{co} = \dfrac{c}{4h} \approx 1~kHz$	4

below which that mode will not propagate (Figure 4).

The attenuation of the modes increases with wavenumber n. Therefore, essentially only the first two modes are involved in the wave propagation The first interference minimum between these two modes is at the same distance as that of the last interference minimum of ray theory (Eq. 3) indicating the equivalence of both theories As seen in Figure 3, the spacing between the mode interference minima is constant and about 1000 km in this example. The first mode becomes dominant at distances greater than about 1500 km, because the second mode is more strongly attenuated than the first mode.

In the range of ELF waves, only mode theory is appropriate. The fundamental mode is the zeroth mode (Figure 4). The D-layer becomes here an electric wall (R_{i} = 1). Its vertical structure is simply a vertical electric field constant with altitude.

In particular, a resonance zeroth mode exists for waves which are an integral part of the Earth's circumference and has the frequency

$f_{m} = \dfrac{mc}{2a\pi} kHz$ $(m = 1, 2, ...)$	5

with the Earth's radius. The first resonance peaks are at 7.5, 15, and 22,5 Hz. These are the Schumann resonances. The spectral signals from lightning are amplified at those frequencies.

== Waveguide characteristics ==
The above discussion merely illustrates a simple picture of mode and ray theory. More detailed treatments require a large computer program. In particular, it is difficult to solve the problem of the horizontal and vertical inhomogeneities of the waveguide. The effect of the Earth's curvature is, that near the antipode the field strength slightly increases. Due to the influence of the Earth' magnetic field, the medium becomes anisotropic so that the ionospheric reflection factor in reality is a matrix. This means that a vertically polarized incident wave after reflection at the ionospheric D-layer converses to a vertically and a horizontally polarized wave. Moreover, the geomagnetic field gives rise to a nonreciprocity of VLF waves. Waves propagating from east to west are more strongly attenuated than vice versa. There appears a phase slipping near the distance of the deep interference minimum of Eq. 3. During the times of sunrise and/or sunset, there is sometimes a phase gain or loss of 360° because of the irreversible behavior of the first sky wave.

The dispersion characteristics of the Earth-ionospheric waveguide can be used for locating thunderstorm activity by measurements of the difference of the group time delay of lightning signals (sferics) at adjacent frequencies up to distances of 10000 km. The Schumann resonances allow to determine the global lightning activity.

== See also ==
- Alfvén resonator
- Atmospheric duct
- Shortwave radio
- Skywave
- Tropospheric ducting
