= Physical phemomenon =

Phenomenon of the material world

A physical phenomenon is a change in the physical structure of matter — regarding shape, size, appearance, motion, and physical state — that does not alter the chemical composition of the matter.

A physical phenomenon is a set of changes and processes occurring in nature. A force is required for physical phenomena to occur. Forces encompass various interactions, such as fundamental interactions (e.g., electric, magnetic, or gravitational) or derived interactions (e.g., intermolecular interactions or friction).

== Etymology, conceptualization of the term, and theoretical systematization ==
Phaenomenon is a word of Greek origin (φαινομενον) meaning "that which appears" or "what is seen".It is defined as a thing in the world that comes into existence and is known through perception.

In modern philosophical usage, the term "phenomenon" refers to things as they are experienced by the senses and processed by the mind, distinct from things in themselves. The term entered modern philosophical usage through Immanuel Kant, who contrasted it with the "noumenon" — something that cannot be directly observed. Kant theorized that the human mind is restricted to the logical world and, therefore, can only interpret and comprehend occurrences based on their physical appearances. He wrote that humans could only infer what their senses allowed, but could not experience the object itself. Thus, the term "phenomenon" refers to any incident worthy of investigation and research, especially processes and events that are particularly unusual or of singular importance.

The elucidation, differentiation, and theoretical systematization of physical phenomena were made possible only through the work of Isaac Newton (1643–1727), James Clerk Maxwell (1831–1879), Sadi Carnot (1796–1832), Rudolf Clausius (1822–1888), Ludwig Boltzmann (1844–1906), Max Planck (1858–1947), Marie Curie (1867–1934), Albert Einstein (1879–1955), Lev Landau (1908–1968), César Lattes (1924–2005), and Abdus Salam (1926–1996).

== Nature of physical phenomena ==
- Mechanical phenomena: phenomena involving physical bodies moving relative to one another (e.g., the Earth's rotation around the Sun).
- Electrical phenomena: phenomena arising from the appearance, existence, movement, and interaction of electric charges (e.g., electric current, telegraphy, lightning during a storm).
- Magnetic phenomena: phenomena associated with the emergence of magnetic properties in physical bodies (e.g., the attraction of objects by a magnet, the turning of a compass needle).
- Optical phenomena: phenomena occurring during the propagation, refraction, and reflection of light (e.g., prisms, mirror reflections, shadows).
- Thermal phenomena: phenomena occurring when physical bodies are heated or cooled (e.g., states of matter).
- Atomic phenomena: phenomena occurring when the internal structure of the matter within physical bodies changes (e.g., nuclear fission and fusion).
- Sound phenomena: phenomena associated with the propagation of vibrations in air, water, or metal, accompanied by the production of sound (e.g., noise, music).
