= Plasmasphere =

Region of Earth's magnetosphere consisting of cool plasma

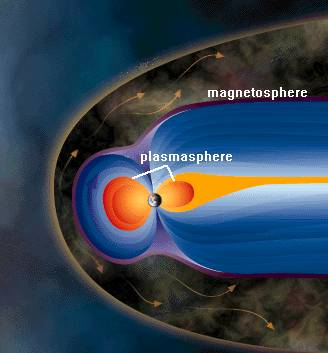

The plasmasphere is a region of the Earth's magnetosphere consisting of low-energy (cool) plasma. It is located above the ionosphere and is co-located with the ring current and Van Allen radiation belts. The outer boundary of the plasmasphere is known as the plasmapause, which is defined by an order of magnitude drop in plasma density. In 1963 American scientist Don Carpenter and Soviet astronomer Konstantin Gringauz proved the plasmasphere and plasmapause's existence from the analysis of very low frequency (VLF) whistler wave data. Traditionally, the plasmasphere has been regarded as a well behaved cold plasma with particle motion dominated entirely by the geomagnetic field and, hence, co-rotating with the Earth.

== History ==
The discovery of the plasmasphere grew out of the scientific study of whistlers, natural phenomena caused by very low frequency (VLF) radio waves. Whistlers were first heard by radio operators in the 1890s. British scientist Llewelyn Robert Owen Storey had shown lightning generated whistlers in his 1953 PhD dissertation. Around the same time, Storey had posited the existence of whistlers meant plasma was present in Earth's atmosphere, and that it moved radio waves in the same direction as Earth's magnetic field lines. From this he deduced but was unable to conclusively prove the existence of the plasmasphere. In 1963 American scientist Don Carpenter and Soviet astronomer Konstantin Gringauz—independently of each other, and the latter using data from the Luna 2 spacecraft—experimentally proved the plasmasphere and plasmapause's existence, building on Storey's thinking.

In 1965 Storey and French scientist M. P. Aubry worked on FR-1, a French scientific satellite equipped with instruments for measuring VLF frequencies and the local electron density of plasma. Aubry and Storey's studies of FR-1 VLF and electron density data further corroborated their theoretical models: VLF waves in the ionosphere occasionally passed through a thin layer of plasma into the magnetosphere, normal to the direction of Earth's magnetic field. Throughout the 1970s, Storey continued studying VLF waves using data gathered by FR-1. Data received from the VLF receiver on OV3-3, launched 4 August 1966, determined the location of the plasmapause.

In 2014 satellite observations from the THEMIS mission have shown that density irregularities such as plumes or biteouts may form. It has also been shown that the plasmasphere does not always co-rotate with the Earth. The plasma of the magnetosphere has many different levels of temperature and concentration. The coldest magnetospheric plasma is most often found in the plasmasphere. However, plasma from the plasmasphere can be detected throughout the magnetosphere because it gets blown around by the Earth's electric and magnetic fields. Data gathered by the twin Van Allen Probes show that the plasmasphere also limits highly-energetic ultrarelativistic electrons from cosmic and solar origin from reaching low earth orbits and the surface of the planet.

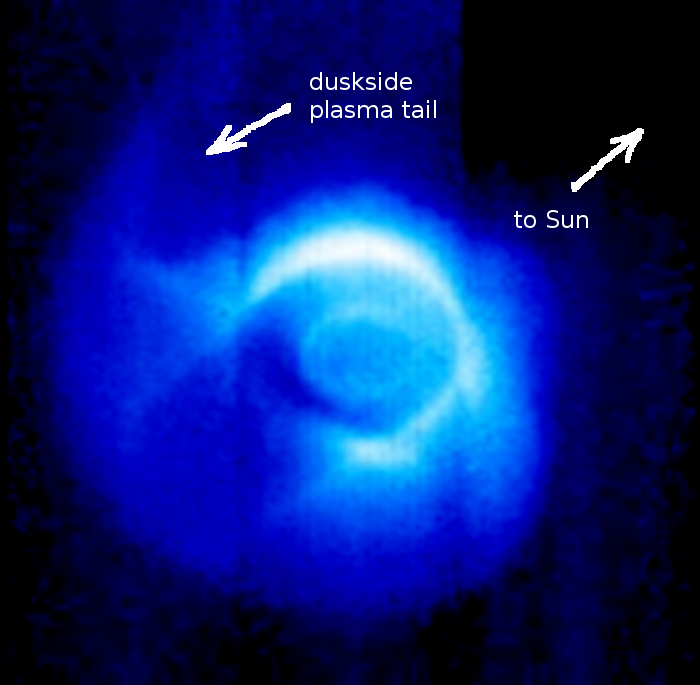
A view from the IMAGE satellite showing Earth's plasmasphere using its Extreme Ultraviolet (EUV) imager instrument.

Visualization of the radiation belts with confined charged particles (blue & yellow) and plasmapause boundary (blue-green surface).

== See also ==
- Magnetosphere chronology
