= Centre national d'études des télécommunications =

French research centre

The Centre national d'études des télécommunications (French language acronym CNET, national center for telecommunication studies in English) was a French national research centre in telecommunications.

During the 1990s, CNET became the research and development centre for the newly-formed France Télécom. It has since been rebranded as France Télécom R&D and later as Orange Labs.

== History ==
The Centre national d'études des télécommunications (CNET) was established on 4 May 1944 as a French interministerial research centre under the general supervision of the French Minister of Postes, télégraphes et téléphones (PTT) (Posts and Telecommunications). CNET was effectively a federation of laboratories and specialised facilities that shared a general administration. These facilities incorporated those of several prior organisations, such as the National Radioelectricity Laboratory (LNR) that had been under the Ministry of War. CNET was active across numerous fields of research, including telephony, radio, acoustics, signal processing, sea communication, and national security matters. It proved to be particularly influential in shaping the strategic direction of France's telephony equipment suppliers as a consequence of CNET effectively becoming the national focus-point for the development of new telecommunications technologies.

One early attempted implementation of CNET-assisted technology was a modified rotary exchange, designated L43, which proved to be unreliable in practice and was abandoned. Instead, foreign-sourced crossbar switches from the Swedish manufacturer Ericsson were source. Nevertheless, CNET continued to research, backed by the favour of the French government. By 1970, it employed 3,000 staff, two-thirds of which were engaged in R&D activities. CNET allowed the Directorate General of Telecommunications (DGT) to make complex interventions into both design and development activities, often using public-financed research as a means of inducing suppliers to explore desired technologies. One such technology with fully-electronic switching gear, using digital coding to handle transmission; CNET allocated a research department to this endeavour and had assembled its first prototypes by 1960. These prototypes led to further research down different paths, including the pursuit of fully-digital time-division multiplexing. This work resulted in the E-10, the world's first commercial fully-electronic time-division switching exchange, which was first installed in January 1970.

CNET's influence was curtailed somewhat after April 1974 and the rise of the d'Estaing government; there was a new emphasis on domestic competition and to break up the traditional procurement process to which CNET had held considerable influence. Nevertheless, it was decided that CNET would play a major role in the adaption of foreign-sourced technologies rather than accepting them outright. Accordingly, the organisation would often develop a greater understanding of these technologies than any single supplier. Into the late 1980s, CNET remained an influential participant in the fields of communications, data processing, components, and satellites.

In 1990, the DGT (part of the French Ministry of Posts and Telecommunications) became France Télécom and CNET became the R&D centre of France Télécom. In March 2000, CNET was renamed and became part of France Télécom R&D, the research and development division of France Télécom. This division was derived from CNET, the Centre commun d'études de télévision et télécommunications (CCETT, created in 1972) as well as other entities. Since 2007, France Telecom R&D is known as Orange Labs, a global network of R&D entities.

== See also ==
- Packet switching
- Protocol Wars
- Rémi Després
- Transpac (data network)
- X.25
