= Radio atmospheric signal =

Broadband electromagnetic impulse

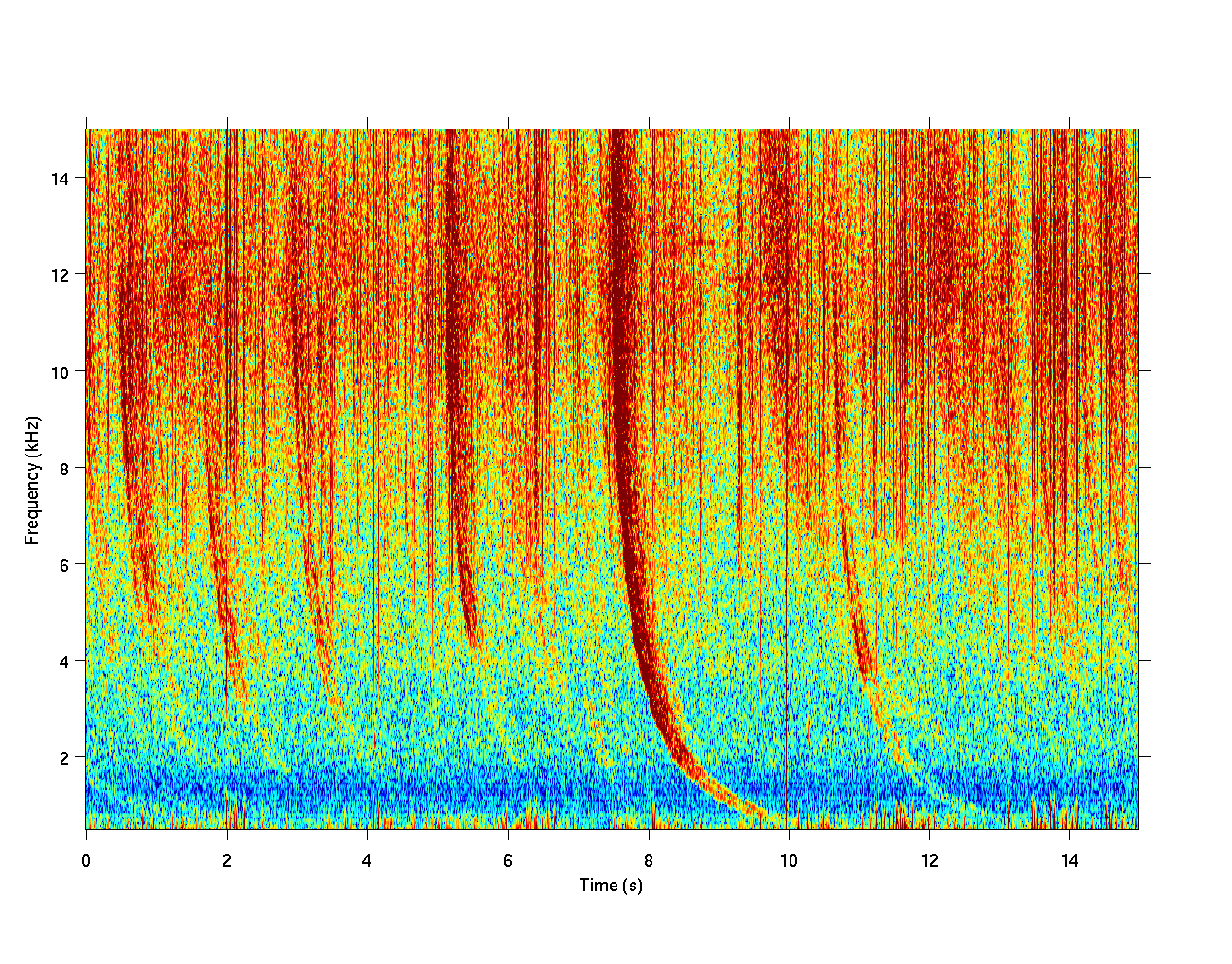
A frequency vs. time plot (spectrogram) showing several whistler signals amidst a background of sferics as received at Palmer Station, Antarctica on August 24, 2005.

A radio atmospheric signal or sferic (sometimes also spelled "spheric") is a broadband electromagnetic impulse that occurs as a result of natural atmospheric lightning discharges. Sferics may propagate from their lightning source without major attenuation in the Earth–ionosphere waveguide, and can be received thousands of kilometres from their source. On a time-domain plot, a sferic may appear as a single high-amplitude spike in the time-domain data. On a spectrogram, a sferic appears as a vertical stripe (reflecting its broadband and impulsive nature) that may extend from a few kHz to several tens of kHz, depending on atmospheric conditions.

Sferics received from about 2,000 kilometres' distance or greater have their frequencies slightly offset in time, producing tweeks.

When the electromagnetic energy from a sferic escapes the Earth-ionosphere waveguide and enters the magnetosphere, it becomes dispersed by the near-Earth plasma, forming a whistler signal. Because the source of the whistler is an impulse (i.e., the sferic), a whistler may be interpreted as the impulse response of the magnetosphere (for the conditions at that particular instant).

== Introduction ==
A lightning channel with all its branches and its electric currents behaves like a huge antenna system from which electromagnetic waves of all frequencies are radiated. Beyond a distance where luminosity is visible and thunder can be heard (typically about 10 km), these electromagnetic impulses are the only sources of direct information about thunderstorm activity on the ground. Transients electric currents during return strokes (R strokes) or intracloud strokes (K strokes) are the main sources for the generation of impulse-type electromagnetic radiation known as sferics (sometimes called atmospherics). While this impulsive radiation dominates at frequencies less than about 100 kHz, (loosely called long waves), a continuous noise component becomes increasingly important at higher frequencies. The longwave electromagnetic propagation of sferics takes place within the Earth-ionosphere waveguide between the Earth's surface and the ionospheric D- and E- layers. Whistlers generated by lightning strokes can propagate into the magnetosphere along the geomagnetic lines of force. Finally, upper-atmospheric lightning or sprites, that occur at mesospheric altitudes, are short-lived electric breakdown phenomena, probably generated by giant lightning events on the ground.

== Source properties ==
=== Basic stroke parameters ===
In a typical cloud-to-ground stroke (R stroke), negative electric charge (electrons) of the order of Q ≈ 1 C stored within the lightning channel is lowered to the ground within a typical impulse time interval of τ = 100 μs . This corresponds to an average current flowing within the channel of the order of J ≈ Q/τ = 10 kA . Maximum spectral energy is generated near frequencies of f ≈ 1/τ = 10 kHz , or at wavelengths of λ = c/f ≈ 30 km (where c is the speed of light). In typical intracloud K-strokes, positive electric charge of the order of Q ≈ 10 mC in the upper part of the channel and an equivalent amount of negative charge in its lower part neutralize within a typical time interval of τ ≈ 25 μs . The corresponding values for average electric current, frequency and wavelength are J ≈ 400 A , f ≈ 40 kHz , and λ ≈ 7.5 km . The energy of K-strokes is in general two orders of magnitude weaker than the energy of R-strokes.

The typical length of lightning channels can be estimated to be of the order of ℓ ≈ 1/4λ = 8 km for R-strokes and ℓ ≈ 1/2λ = 4 km for K-strokes. Often, a continuing current component flows between successive R-strokes. Its "pulse" time typically varies between about 10–150 ms , its electric current is of the order of J ≈ 100 A , corresponding to the numbers of Q ≈ 1–20 C , f ≈ 7–100 Hz and λ ≈ 3–40 Mm . Both R-strokes as well as K-strokes produce sferics seen as a coherent impulse waveform within a broadband receiver tuned between 1–100 kHz. The electric field strength of the impulse increases to a maximum value within a few microseconds and then declines like a damped oscillator. The orientation of the field strength increase depends on whether it is a negative or a positive discharge

The visible part of a lightning channel has a typical length of about 5 km. Another part of comparable length may be hidden in the cloud and may have a significant horizontal branch. Evidently, the dominant wavelength of the electromagnetic waves of R- and K-strokes is much larger than their channel lengths. The physics of electromagnetic wave propagation within the channel must thus be derived from full wave theory, because the ray concept breaks down.

=== Electric channel current ===
The channel of a R stroke can be considered as a thin isolated wire of length L and diameter d in which negative electric charge has been stored. In terms of electric circuit theory, one can adopt a simple transmission line model with a capacitor, where the charge is stored, a resistance of the channel, and an inductance simulating the electric properties of the channel. At the moment of contact with the perfectly conducting Earth surface, the charge is lowered to the ground. In order to fulfill the boundary conditions at the top of the wire (zero electric current) and at the ground (zero electric voltage), only standing resonant waves modes can exit. The fundamental mode which transports electric charge to the ground most effectively, has thus a wavelength λ four times the channel length L. In the case of the K stroke, the lower boundary is the same as the upper boundary. Of course, this picture is valid only for wave mode 1 (λ/4 antenna) and perhaps for mode 2 (λ/2 antenna), because these modes do not yet "feel" the contorted configuration of the real lightning channel. The higher order modes contribute to the incoherent noisy signals in the higher frequency range (> 100 kHz).

== Transfer function of Earth–ionosphere waveguide ==
Sferics can be simulated approximately by the electromagnetic radiation field of a vertical Hertzian dipole antenna. The maximum spectral amplitude of the sferic typically is near 5 kHz. Beyond this maximum, the spectral amplitude decreases as 1/f if the Earth's surface were perfectly conducting. The effect of the real ground is to attenuate the higher frequencies more strongly than the lower frequencies (Sommerfeld's ground wave).

R strokes emit most of their energy within the ELF/VLF range (ELF = extremely low frequencies, < 3 kHz; VLF = very low frequencies, 3–30 kHz). These waves are reflected and attenuated on the ground as well as within the ionospheric D layer, near 70 km altitude during day time conditions, and near 90 km height during the night. Reflection and attenuation on the ground depends on frequency, distance, and orography. In the case of the ionospheric D-layer, it depends, in addition, on time of day, season, latitude, and the geomagnetic field in a complicated manner. VLF propagation within the Earth–ionosphere waveguide can be described by ray theory and by wave theory.

When distances are less than about 500 km (depending on frequency), then ray theory is appropriate. The ground wave and the first hop (or sky) wave reflected at the ionospheric D layer interfere with each other.

At distances greater than about 500 km, sky waves reflected several times at the ionosphere must be added. Therefore, mode theory is here more appropriate. The first mode is least attenuated within the Earth–ionosphere waveguide, and thus dominates at distances greater than about 1000 km.

The Earth–ionosphere waveguide is dispersive. Its propagation characteristics are described by a transfer function T(ρ, f) depending mainly on distance ρ and frequency f. In the VLF range, only mode one is important at distances larger than about 1000 km. Least attenuation of this mode occurs at about 15 kHz. Therefore, the Earth–ionosphere waveguide behaves like a bandpass filter, selecting this band out of a broadband signal. The 15 kHz signal dominates at distances greater than about 5000 km. For ELF waves (< 3 kHz), ray theory becomes invalid, and only mode theory is appropriate. Here, the zeroth mode begins to dominate and is responsible for the second window at greater distances.

Resonant waves of this zeroth mode can be excited in the Earth–ionosphere waveguide cavity, mainly by the continuing current components of lightning flowing between two return strokes. Their wavelengths are integral fractions of the Earth's circumference, and their resonance frequencies can thus be approximately determined by f_{m} ≃ mc/(2πa) ≃ 7.5 m Hz (with m = 1, 2, ...; a the Earth's radius and c the speed of light). These resonant modes with their fundamental frequency of f_{1} ≃ 7.5 Hz are known as Schumann resonances.

== Monitoring thunderstorm activity with sferics ==
About 100 lightning strokes per second are generated all over the world excited by thunderstorms located mainly in the continental areas at low and middle latitudes. In order to monitor the thunderstorm activity, sferics are the appropriate means.

Measurements of Schumann resonances at only a few stations around the world can monitor the global lightning activity fairly well. One can apply the dispersive property of the Earth–ionosphere waveguide by measuring the group velocity of a sferic signal at different frequencies together with its direction of arrival. The group time delay difference of neighbouring frequencies in the lower VLF band is directly proportional to the distance of the source. Since the attenuation of VLF waves is smaller for west to east propagation and during the night, thunderstorm activity up to distances of about 10,000 km can be observed for signals arriving from the west during night time conditions. Otherwise, the transmission range is of the order of 5,000 km.

For the regional range (< 1,000 km), the usual way is magnetic direction finding as well as time of arrival measurements of a sferic signal observed simultaneously at several stations. Presumption of such measurements is the concentration on one individual impulse. If one measures simultaneously several pulses, interference takes place with a beat frequency equal to the inversal average sequence time of the pulses.

== Atmospheric noise ==
The signal-to-noise ratio determines the sensibility and sensitivity of telecommunication systems (e.g., radio receivers). An analog signal must clearly exceed the noise amplitude in order to become detectable. Atmospheric noise is one of the most important sources for the limitation of the detection of radio signals.

The steady electric discharging currents in a lightning channel cause a series of incoherent impulses in the whole frequency range, the amplitudes of which decreases approximately with the inverse frequency. In the ELF-range, technical noise from 50 to 60 Hz, natural noise from the magnetosphere, etc. dominates. In the VLF-range, there are the coherent impulses from R- and K-strokes, appearing out of the background noise. Beyond about 100 kHz, the noise amplitude becomes more and more incoherent. In addition, technical noise from electric motors, ignition systems of motor cars, etc., are superimposed. Finally, beyond the high frequency band (3–30 MHz) extraterrestrial noise (noise of galactic origin, solar noise) dominates.

The atmospheric noise depends on frequency, location and time of day and year. Worldwide measurements of that noise are documented in CCIR-reports. (Note: The acronym CCIR stands for Comité Consultatif International des Radiocommunications (International Consultation Committee on Radio Communications).)

== See also ==
- 1955 Great Plains tornado outbreak
- Cluster One, a Pink Floyd track using sferics and dawn chorus as an overture
