= Cosmic noise =

Physical phenomenon from outside of the Earth's atmosphere

Cosmic noise, also known as galactic radio noise, is radio-frequency electromagnetic radiation from sources outside of the Earth's atmosphere. Its characteristics are comparable to those of thermal noise. Cosmic noise occurs at frequencies above about 15 MHz when highly directional antennas are pointed toward the Sun or other regions of the sky, such as the center of the Milky Way Galaxy. Celestial objects like quasars, which are super dense objects far from Earth, emit electromagnetic waves in their full spectrum, including radio waves. The fall of a meteorite can also be heard through a radio receiver; the falling object burns from friction with the Earth's atmosphere, ionizing surrounding gases and producing radio waves. Cosmic microwave background radiation (CMBR) from outer space is also a form of cosmic noise. CMBR is thought to be a relic of the Big Bang, and pervades the space almost homogeneously over the entire celestial sphere. The bandwidth of the CMBR is wide, though the peak is in the microwave range.

== History ==
Karl Jansky, an American physicist and radio engineer, first discovered radio waves from the Milky Way in August, 1931. At Bell Telephone Laboratories in 1932, Jansky built an antenna designed to receive radio waves at a frequency of 20.5 MHz, which is a wavelength of approximately 14.6 meters.

After recording signals with this antenna for several months, Jansky categorized them into three types: nearby thunderstorms, distant thunderstorms, and a faint steady hiss of an unknown origin. He discovered the location of maximum intensity rose and fell once a day, which led him to believe he was detecting radiation from the Sun.

A few months went by following this signal thought to be from the Sun, and Jansky found that the brightest point moved away from the Sun and concluded the cycle repeated every 23 hours and 56 minutes. After this discovery, Jansky concluded the radiation was coming from the Milky Way and was strongest in the direction of the center of the galaxy.

Jansky's work helped to distinguish between the radio sky and the optical sky. The optical sky is what is seen by the human eye, whereas the radio sky consists of daytime meteors, solar bursts, quasars, and gravitational waves.

Later in 1963, American physicist and radio astronomer Arno Allan Penzias (born April 26, 1933) discovered cosmic microwave background radiation. Penzias's discovery of cosmic microwave background radiation helped establish the Big Bang theory of cosmology. Penzias and his partner, Robert Woodrow Wilson worked together on ultra-sensitive cryogenic microwave receivers, originally intended for radio astronomy observations. In 1964, upon creating their most sensitive antenna/receiver system, the Holmdel Horn Antenna, the two discovered a radio noise they could not explain. After further investigation, Penzias contacted Robert Dicke, who suggested it could be the background radiation predicted by cosmological theories, a radio remnant of the Big Bang. Penzias and Wilson won the Nobel Prize in Physics in 1978.

=== NASA's work ===
The Absolute Radiometer for Cosmology, Astrophysics, and Diffuse Emission (ARCADE) is a device designed to observe the transition out of the "cosmic dark ages" as the first stars ignite in nuclear fusion and the universe begins to resemble its current form.

ARCADE consists of 7 precision radiometers carried to an altitude of over 35 km (21 miles) by a scientific research balloon. The device measures the tiny heating of the early universe by the first generation of stars and galaxies to form after the Big Bang.

== Sources of cosmic noise ==
Cosmic noise refers to the background radio frequency radiation from galactic sources, which have constant intensity during geomagnetically quiet periods.

=== Sun flares ===
Cosmic noise can be traced from solar flares, which are sudden explosive releases of stored magnetic energy in the atmosphere of the Sun, causing sudden brightening of the photosphere. Solar flares can last from a few minutes to several hours.

During solar flare events, particles and electromagnetic emissions can affect Earth's atmosphere by fluctuating the level of ionization in the Earth's ionosphere. Increased ionization results in absorption of the cosmic radio noise as it passes through the ionosphere.

=== Solar wind ===
Solar wind is a flux of particles, protons and electrons together with nuclei of heavier elements in smaller numbers, that are accelerated by the high temperatures of the solar corona to velocities large enough to allow them to escape from the Sun's gravitational field.

Solar wind causes sudden bursts of cosmic noise absorption in the Earth's ionosphere. These bursts can only be detected only if the magnitude of the geomagnetic field perturbation caused by the solar wind shock is large enough.

== See also ==
- Intergalactic space – Void between celestial bodies
- Interplanetary space – Material which fills the Solar System
- Interstellar medium – Matter and radiation in the space between the star systems in a galaxy
- Radio astronomy – Subfield of astronomy that studies celestial objects at radio frequencies
