= Regulation of cryptocurrency =

Management of a securities market

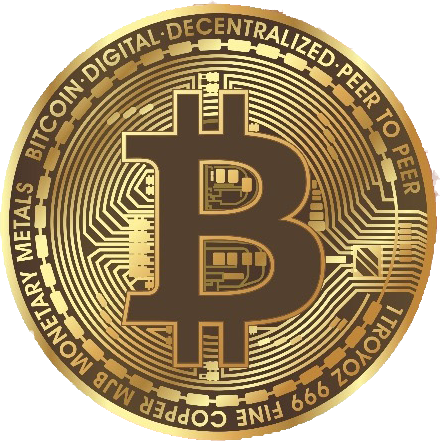
Bitcoin, the largest cryptocurrency, is one of the primary targets of the regulation of cryptocurrency

The regulation of cryptocurrency constitutes regulatory, legal and political actions taken by various governments to regulate and oversee the development and adoption of bitcoin, cryptocurrencies and blockchain technologies. Restrictions on cryptocurrency have been motivated by concerns regarding financial stability, consumer protection, national security, and enforcing laws against money laundering and other illegal activity. These actions have drawn criticism from privacy advocates, finance companies, and open source code developers.

== Background ==
Following the rise of cryptocurrencies in the 2010s and 2020s, governments responded with increased regulatory attention alleging concerns regarding consumer protection, fraud, and illegal activity. In 2022, the major centralized crypto exchange FTX collapsed, which increased the calls for regulation by governments, particularly in the United States.

Critics of cryptocurrency regulation broadly argue that cryptocurrencies empower individuals and challenge traditional financial systems so regulations must balance targeting fraud and other illicit activity with concerns for individual liberties and innovation.

== History ==
=== United States ===
==== Early regulations, 2013–2017 ====
In 2013, the U.S. Financial Crimes Enforcement Network (FINCEN) classified certain cryptocurrency businesses and projects as money transmitters. This subjected the businesses to anti-money laundering (AML) regulations. In 2017, the SEC began declaring some initial coin offerings (ICOs) as unregistered securities and taking enforcement action against them. Regulators and some policymakers cite concerns about the use of cryptocurrencies in fraud and illegal activity. Some commentators stated these regulations failed to balance innovation with regulatory control and led to a chilling of the industry.

==== SEC enforcement ====
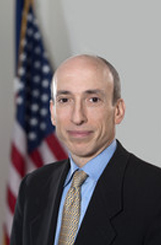
Gary Gensler, former Chair of the SEC has been the subject of praise and criticism for his central role in the regulation of cryptocurrency.

As SEC chair, Gary Gensler filed more than 120 lawsuits against cryptocurrency companies and projects. Gensler described the market as "the Wild West" due to his perception that the industry lacked sufficient regulatory oversight. The SEC has argued that applying securities law is necessary to protect retail investors from speculative projects. In 2020, the SEC filed a lawsuit against Ripple, claiming the sale of its token was tantamount to the sale of unregistered securities. Ripple CEO Brad Garlinghouse criticized the SEC for lacking regulatory clarity which he believes has hindered innovation using blockchain technology and unfairly targeted legitimate projects that did not qualify as securities. In 2024, Ripple won a partial legal victory when a court ruled that retail XRP sales were not securities transactions.

In 2021, the SEC charged LBRY, a blockchain-based video platform with selling unregistered digital securities in the form of their LBRY credits (LBC). The claim was litigated in federal court. Similar to Ripple, LBRY alleged the SEC lacked regulatory clarity in enforcement proceedings stating, "Even after five years of fighting and a court ruling, we still honestly do not know how to legally launch a public blockchain in the U.S." In response to the SEC's litigation, Jeremy Kauffman, the founder of LBRY, asserted that " the SEC has an agenda out to hurt or destroy the cryptocurrency industry." In 2022, a federal court ruled in favor of the SEC's determination that the LBC tokens constituted a security and must be registered as such with the SEC. In 2023, LBRY shut down operations due to an inability to pay the SEC fines, legal costs and private debtors.

In 2023, the SEC began enforcement action against major cryptocurrency exchanges such as Binance and Coinbase, alleging operation of unregistered securities platforms. Additionally, the original complaint against Binance alleged violations of illegally serving U.S. users and commingling customer funds. The charges were formally dropped in 2025 in a move that Mackenzie Sigalos, writing for CNBC, described "a symbolic end to one of the most aggressive crypto crackdowns in U.S. history."

==== DOJ criminal prosecutions of privacy tools ====
In 2023, the U.S. Department of Justice charged Roman Storm, the developer of the Ethereum-based mixing service Tornado Cash, with conspiracy to commit money laundering. In 2024, the DOJ arrested Keonne Rodriguez and William Lonergan Hill, developers of Samourai Wallet, a privacy-focused bitcoin wallet that uses a Coinjoin tool that mixes a bitcoin transaction with other transactions, also alleging money laundering. Critics of the prosecutions described them as attacks on open source application development and financial privacy and made parallels to other historical examples of prosecution of privacy tools such as encryption software. Organizations, such as the Electronic Frontier Foundation, argue that these prosecutions constitute an unconstitutional attack on freedom of speech, arguing that the writing and development of code is protected by the First Amendment.

==== Legislation and political campaigns ====
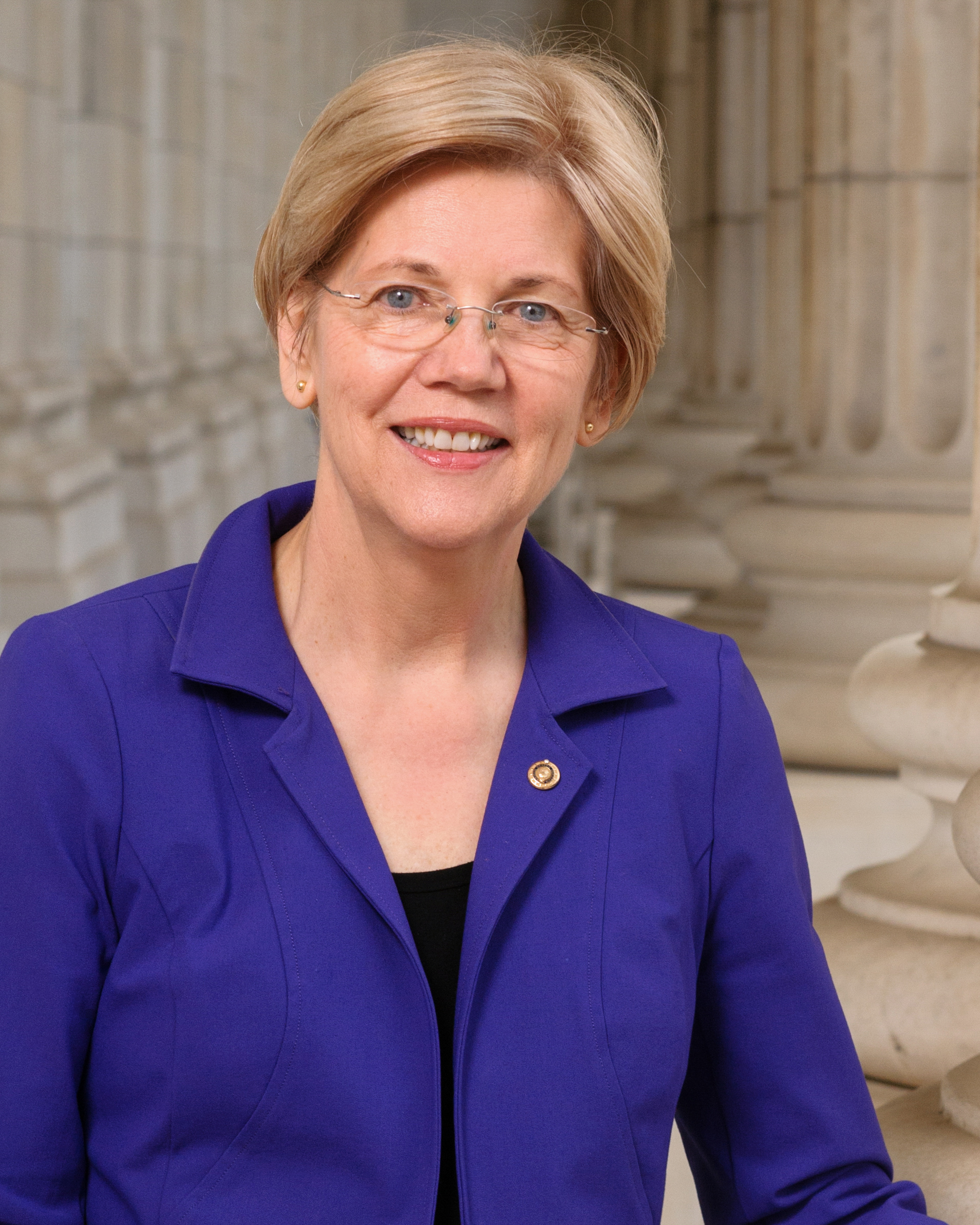
Elizabeth Warren, a leading advocate of tighter crypto oversight, whose “anti-crypto army" stance has drawn criticism from libertarian and crypto-industry groups.

Senator Elizabeth Warren has been a persistent advocate for increasing regulations on cryptocurrencies, going so far as to create what she called an "anti-crypto army." Warren supported legislation to expand anti-money laundering compliance and increase federal surveillance on crypto. Some have described Warren's actions as attacks on user privacy, individual custody of money, and the ability to securely hold inflation hedges and that these attacks are a political miscalculation.

John Deaton, one of Warren's competitors in her 2024 Senate race, cited Warren’s support for regulation of cryptocurrencies as a primary motivation to run against her. Deaton stated "She's always been going to lose the war [on crypto] because I think I'm gonna beat her." Some US Democrats are supportive of cryptocurrency and have been critical of proposals to regulate it. Corey Booker has discussed how he believes crypto is a “democratizing" force and helps people who have been shut out from traditional banking receive increased financial access.

In 2023, while running for president, Ron DeSantis claimed that the Biden Administration had declared a "war on bitcoin and cryptocurrency" that he claimed he would end if elected president.

==== Shift in U.S. policy ====
In the 2024 presidential election, crypto regulation became a wedge issue. Donald Trump, originally a critic of cryptocurrency and bitcoin, saying bitcoin was "based on thin air," reversed his stance in the election, stating he would end what he called "Kamala's," "Biden's," and the "federal bureaucracy's" regulation of cryptocurrencies. He also stated he would fire Gary Gensler. Observers noted that Trump's reversal was similar to other populist pivots he has done previously.

As a result, individuals in the crypto industry began to support Trump's campaign. The Winklevoss twins donated millions, venture capitalist David Sacks hosted a fundraiser for his campaign, and a crypto-focused PAC called Fairshake was created to oppose anti-crypto politicians and support pro-crypto politicians. Following Trump's electoral victory, Gary Gensler announced that he would step down on January 20, 2025. As part of Trump's inauguration, he held a Crypto Ball where David Sacks declared that, "The war on crypto is over."

In 2025, after returning to office, Trump advanced a series of pro-crypto measures. He signed an executive order ordering the creation of a strategic bitcoin reserve. He also hosted a White House crypto summit with industry leaders present to discuss regulatory reform and technological innovation. In February 2025, the SEC dropped its lawsuit against Coinbase and halted investigations into Gemini, OpenSea and Uniswap Labs. Following these changes, Cameron Winklevoss stated that, “This marks another milestone to the end of the war on crypto.” Other observers said that these actions symbolized a political pivot and a de-escalation in the "war on crypto". The Trump administration has not ceased all enforcement actions against cryptocurrency projects. The prosecution of Tornado Cash founder Roman Storm continues to be ongoing with chief legal officer of the crypto firm Variant stating, "This really is a vestige of the Biden administration’s war on crypto", and that, "It’s shocking the case is still moving forward.”

In 2025, the House Committee on Financial Services and Senate Banking Committee started investigations into "Operation Chokepoint 2.0", an alleged conspiracy that claims the Federal Deposit Insurance Corporation (FDIC) and other regulators coordinated to pressure banks to stop business with all crypto-related activity.

=== China ===
In 2017, China banned cryptocurrency exchanges with concerns of "capital outflows" and "financial instability." In 2021, China's Inner Mongolia region announced a local "war on cryptocurrency mining", to meet energy targets. Shortly thereafter, national authorities banned crypto mining nationwide. Analysts state that cryptocurrencies are seen as a threat to the use of the digital yuan.

=== Europe ===
In the European Union, management of the crtyptocurrency market has mainly focused on safeguarding user privacy and fighting moneylaundering rather than outright bans on sales. In 2018, the Fifth Anti-Money Laundering Directive (AMLD5) in Europe began the process of regulating cryptocurrency exchanges and self-custodial wallets. In 2021, the European Commission sought to create a surveillance system that would collect and share data on millions of crypto users, with the stated motivation of "beating financial crime." In 2022, European policymakers have advanced measures that some critics argue threaten financial privacy. One of these proposed EU rules targets self-custodial bitcoin wallets, which some have claimed would limit an individual's ability to hold crypto outside of centralized exchanges. In response, civic initiatives such as the Digital Freedom Declaration have called on the EU to establish clearer legal protections for privacy-enhancing technologies, arguing that privacy is a human right that should be applicable to digital and financial activity. In 2024, a panel of judges in the Netherlands convicted Alexey Pertsev, one of the developers of Tornado Cash, with money laundering for developing the code for the open source project. In 2025, the Financial Action Task Force Travel Rule, began to require verifying wallet ownership and collect personal data. Additionally, financial institutions, including cryptocurrency exchanges must collect know your customer information and share it with other institutions involved in the transaction. Critics say that these regulations could push users toward centralized custodians, exposing them to risks such as hacking, data breaches, and government surveillance of transactions.

== See also ==
- blockchain – Distributed data store for digital transactions
- Ponzi scheme – Type of financial fraud
- Pump and dump – Form of securities fraud
