= Federal Prison Camp, Morgantown =

Minimum-security prison in West Virginia, US

Coordinates: 39°36′06″N 79°56′58″W

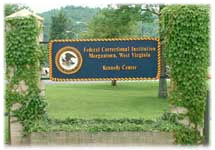
- Interactive map of Federal Prison Camp, Morgantown
- Location: Monongalia County, near Morgantown, West Virginia
- Status: Operational
- Security class: Minimum-security
- Population: 368 (April 2024)
- Managed by: Federal Bureau of Prisons

The Federal Prison Camp, Morgantown (previously the Federal Correctional Institution, Morgantown) is a minimum-security United States federal prison for male inmates in West Virginia. It is operated by the Federal Bureau of Prisons, a division of the United States Department of Justice. The facility has been nicknamed 'Club Fed' because of its amenities which include a large college-like campus, a movie theater, a bocce ball court and a basketball court as well as housing many white collar, nonviolent offenders.

FPC Morgantown is located near the city of Morgantown in northern West Virginia and approximately 160 miles northeast of Charleston, the state capital.

== History ==
Senator Ted Kennedy dedicated the Robert F. Kennedy Youth Center in December 1968. The facility was designed to be the first of its kind to test a new method of detention employing an experimental "unit management" model that promoted a humane approach, grouping inmates into units of 50 to 200 overseen by multidisciplinary teams and specialized staff to tend to inmate needs including religious services, training, and counseling and rehabilitation. Less than a decade after opening, the facility transitioned from housing juvenile offenders to adult, male inmates. The name of the facility was later changed to 'Federal Correctional Institution, Morgantown Kennedy Center'

== Notable incidents ==
In August 2008, 50-year-old Randall Michael pleaded guilty to committing mail fraud while he was an inmate at FCI Morgantown. Michael masterminded a scheme to obtain money by falsely representing himself to potential investors as a wealthy executive who was attempting to obtain a grant requiring a refundable $50,000 bond with which he would purchase approximately 13 acres for $3.9 million for coal exploration. One individual subsequently mailed Michael a check for $26,250 addressed to the false bonding company, which Michael cashed and distributed to members of his own family. Michael was sentenced to an additional 24 months in prison on July 9, 2009.

== Notable inmates ==
=== Current ===
Inmate Name	Register Number	Status	Details
Mike Madigan	90368-509	Serving a 7½ years sentence.	67th and 69th Speaker of the Illinois House of Representatives, convicted on bribery, wire fraud, and Travel Act violations. On April 27, 2026 the U.S. Seventh Circuit Appeals Court ruled him to remain in the prison to complete his sentence.
Keonne Rodriguez	11404-511	Serving a 5 year sentence.	Co-founder of Samourai Wallet, convicted of unlicensed money transmission.

=== Former ===
Inmate Name	Register Number	Photo	Status	Details
Bob Ney	28882-016		Released from custody in 2008; served 11 months.	Ohio Congressman from 1995 to 2006; pleaded guilty in 2006 to conspiracy to commit honest services fraud and making false statements related to the Jack Abramoff Indian lobbying scandal.
Richard Hatch	05559-070		Released from custody in 2009; served 3 years.	Contestant on the CBS television program Survivor in 2000; convicted of tax evasion in 2006 for failing to report income, including $1 million he won on the show and $321,000 he was paid by a Boston radio station.
Patrick Cannon	29396-058		Released from custody in 2017; served 22 months.	Mayor of Charlotte, NC from December 2013 to March 2014; pleaded guilty in 2014 to honest services fraud for accepting $50,000 in bribes from undercover FBI agents posing as investors in exchange for using his official position to benefit them.
R. Seth Williams	75926-066		Served a 5-year sentence; released in 2020.	Former Philadelphia District Attorney; pleaded guilty to one count of bribery.
Rick Renzi	29375-208		Released from custody in 2017; served 2 years.	Arizona Congressman from 2003 to 2009; convicted in 2013 of extortion, bribery, insurance fraud, money laundering and racketeering for receiving $1.5 million from a land developer and committing insurance fraud to fund his campaign.
Eric Ian Spoutz	73078-112		Served a 41-month sentence; released May 2020.	A former art dealer from Michigan; Eric pleaded guilty to selling forged art works from artists such as Picasso, de Kooning, Marc Chagall and Joan Mitchell. Eric was forced to forfeit the $1.45 million he made from the scheme and pay $154,100 in fines.
James Clifton Jr.	21293-084		Served a 5-month sentence; released January 2017.	A former Sales Manager for a local Car Dealership and the former Bristol Virginia Utilities (BVU) Board Chairman who pleaded Guilty to 1 count of conspiracy to commit program fraud and misprison of a felony. He conspired with other BVU Employees to rig bids on fleet vehicles purchases to ensure his employer was the low bidder.
Walter P. Reed	34260-034		Was serving a 4-year sentence; released from custody on October 8, 2021.	Former St. Tammany Parish District Attorney; was convicted of 18 counts of public corruption charges in May 2016.
Happy Asker	48788-039		Was serving a 50-month prison sentence; released from custody on August 17, 2018.	President and founder of Detroit-based Happy's Pizza, found guilty of 32 tax crimes and conspiracy to defraud the U.S. The jury took 4.5 hours to convict on 3 counts of filing of false returns for Happy's pizza franchises and one count of engaging in a corrupt endeavor to obstruct and impede the administration of the IRS
Bill Courtright	76927-067		Was serving a 7 year sentence; released from prison after serving less than 4 years of sentence on August 27, 2024.	30th Mayor of Scranton, convicted on public corruption charges involving bribery, extortion and criminal conspiracy.

== See also ==
- List of U.S. federal prisons
- Federal Bureau of Prisons
- Incarceration in the United States
