= Blockchain privacy =

Privacy in blockchain systems

Blockchain privacy describes how blockchain systems handle the confidentiality of transaction and record data. Many public blockchains can provide pseudonymity, while ledger transparency can allow transaction tracing through analysis of on-chain activity and related information. The persistence of ledger data can also create data-protection challenges in some applications, including questions about erasure and rectification rights where personal data are involved, and privacy characteristics vary depending on system design and use case.

Many blockchain systems represent participants using cryptographic addresses rather than real-world identities, which can provide pseudonymity. However, transaction histories associated with addresses are typically visible to participants, which can enable linkage and tracing of activity under some conditions.

== Comparison of blockchain privacy systems ==
=== Public blockchains ===
Public (permissionless) blockchains allow anyone to participate in maintaining and verifying the ledger. They typically use cryptographic addresses rather than real-world identities, providing pseudonymity while making transaction data and histories visible to all participants. This transparency enables tracing and linkage of activity through on-chain analysis and related off-chain information.

=== Private blockchains ===
Private (permissioned) blockchains restrict who can join the network and who can participate in consensus or view transactions. Because access is limited to approved participants, these systems can be configured to provide stronger privacy controls than public blockchains in some contexts. The specific privacy properties depend on access policies and governance rather than on inherent transparency.

=== Hybrid blockchains ===
Hybrid blockchains combine elements of public and permissioned systems, allowing some data to remain publicly auditable while restricting access to other information. Privacy and data-protection outcomes depend heavily on system design and use case, and that some implementations store personal data off-chain while recording only cryptographic commitments, such as hashes, on-chain.

== Cryptographic methods for privacy using blockchains ==
=== Zero-knowledge proofs ===
A zero-knowledge proof (ZKP) is a cryptographic method by which one party (the prover) can prove to another party (the verifier) that a given statement is true, without conveying any information apart from the fact that the statement is indeed true. The prover does not reveal any information about the transaction. Such proofs are typically introduced into blockchain systems using ZK-SNARKs in order to increase privacy in blockchains.

In typical non-private public blockchain systems such as Bitcoin, a block contains information about a transaction, such as the sender and receiver's addresses and the amount sent. This public information can be used in conjunction with clustering algorithms to link these pseudo-anonymous addresses to users or real-world identities. Since zero-knowledge proofs reveal nothing about a transaction except that it is valid, the effectiveness of such techniques is drastically reduced. A prominent example of a cryptocurrency using zero-knowledge proofs is Zcash.

=== Ring signatures ===
Another method of obfuscating the flow of transactions on public blockchains is the use of ring signatures, a method employed by Monero.

=== Mixing ===
Cryptocurrency tumblers can be used as a method to increase privacy in pseudo-anonymous cryptocurrencies. In addition to third-party services, mixing can also be implemented directly within blockchain protocols, as in Dash.

The popular mixing service Tornado Cash was sanctioned by the U.S. Department of the Treasury in August 2022, which accused it of laundering $455 million in stolen cryptocurrency by the Lazarus Group. The sanctions made it illegal for U.S. citizens, residents, and companies to use the service.

In April 2024, Keonne Rodriguez and William Lonergan Hill, the founders of Samourai Wallet, a privacy-focused CoinJoin tool that mixes Bitcoin transactions, were charged by the U.S. Department of Justice, which alleged that the application enabled money laundering.

== Applications and trade-offs ==
=== Financial transactions ===
Public blockchains used for financial transactions typically represent participants using cryptographic addresses rather than real-world identities. However, transaction data are often publicly visible, enabling transaction tracing and linkage through analysis of on-chain activity and related off-chain information.

Privacy risks can also arise at system endpoints: compromise of wallets, user devices, or custodial services may expose transaction histories associated with affected addresses and enable unauthorized spending.

=== Health care records ===
A 2018 study published in Sustainable Cities and Society proposed Ancile, a blockchain-based framework for access control and interoperability in electronic health records.

A 2021 systematic review published in JMIR Medical Informatics concluded that although research interest in blockchain-based personal health records is increasing, the technology remains largely conceptual and has seen limited real-world deployment.

== Legality of blockchain and privacy ==
=== GDPR ===
Following the adoption of the General Data Protection Regulation (GDPR) in the European Union in April 2016, questions have arisen regarding blockchain's compatibility with EU data-protection law.

GDPR applies both to entities processing data within the EU and to entities outside the EU that process personal data relating to individuals in the EU. Personal data is defined as any information relating to an identified or identifiable natural person.

Because blockchain systems associate activity with cryptographic public keys, which may be linkable to individuals under certain conditions, such data may fall within the scope of personal data under GDPR even when direct identification is not explicit. A central challenge arises from the GDPR right to erasure, often referred to as the right to be forgotten. Due to blockchain's immutability, deleting or modifying recorded data after validation may be technically infeasible.

In April 2025, the European Data Protection Board issued Guidelines 02/2025 on the processing of personal data through blockchain technologies. The guidance highlights tensions between blockchain immutability and GDPR rights such as erasure and rectification, and it outlines recommendations including role clarification for data controllers, data minimisation, and privacy-by-design measures.

== Concerns regarding blockchain privacy ==
=== Transparency ===
Although blockchain technology allows users to transact without relying on centralized intermediaries, its transparency can raise privacy concerns.

Public blockchains allow any participant to view transaction data, which can be analyzed using block explorers and combined with open-source intelligence techniques to trace financial activity and build user profiles.

=== Data minimization ===
A central principle in many privacy frameworks is data minimization, which holds that systems should collect and process only the minimum amount of personal data necessary for a given purpose.

In blockchain systems, design choices such as recording transaction metadata on-chain or encoding identifiers in publicly verifiable ledgers can raise data-minimization concerns where such data are linkable to identifiable individuals. Guidance on blockchain and data protection emphasizes avoiding the storage of personal data on-chain where possible and using techniques such as off-chain storage or cryptographic commitments to limit on-chain exposure.

=== Storage limitation and retention ===
Under data protection frameworks such as the GDPR, personal data should not be kept in identifiable form longer than necessary for the purposes for which they are processed. Guidance on processing personal data through blockchain technologies notes that this storage limitation principle can be difficult to satisfy in distributed ledger systems, where data are replicated across participants and effectively immutable once confirmed.

The guidance highlights that because data on a blockchain cannot be deleted or modified after confirmation, blockchain architectures may conflict with storage limitation principles in contexts where identifiable personal data are recorded or linked to on-chain activity.

=== Rights to rectification and erasure ===
Data-protection frameworks such as the GDPR provide data subjects with rights intended to limit ongoing exposure of personal data over time, including the Right to be forgotten (right to erasure) and the right to rectification.

Guidance on blockchain and data protection notes that these rights can be difficult to implement in blockchain systems where ledger entries are replicated across participants and are designed to be immutable once confirmed. As a result, the ability to mitigate or remediate privacy impacts after disclosure or later identification of individuals may be limited compared with systems in which records can be deleted, modified, or access-restricted.

=== Network surveillance ===
Privacy risks can arise at the network layer of blockchain systems due to the way transactions are propagated. To submit a transaction, users typically broadcast it to peer nodes, which may expose network-level metadata such as IP addresses, timing information, or peer connections. Studies note that observers monitoring peer-to-peer communication can use this metadata to infer the origin of transactions or approximate user locations, potentially undermining pseudonymity even when on-chain identifiers are not directly linked to real-world identities.

Network-layer privacy risks are distinct from those associated with on-chain transparency, as they arise from communication patterns rather than ledger contents. As a result, privacy-enhancing techniques applied at the transaction or cryptographic level may not fully mitigate exposure caused by network-level observation.

=== Off-chain layer ===
The off-chain layer refers to data storage, computation, or communication that occurs outside the blockchain system while remaining linked to it through cryptographic references. Although off-chain mechanisms are commonly used to improve scalability and functionality, the literature identifies several privacy risks associated with off-chain interactions.

One major concern is identity linkage, where users inadvertently associate blockchain activity with real-world identities. This can occur through external disclosures, such as publicly sharing wallet addresses, or through interactions with intermediaries that require identity verification, which can link government-issued identification to blockchain addresses during off-chain account creation.

Metadata leakage is another reported risk. Off-chain solutions such as payment channels may reveal transactional patterns, including frequency, amounts, or counterparties, for example if intermediaries log routing or communication data. Similarly, storing private records in off-chain storage systems can expose metadata such as timestamps or geolocation tags unless the data are encrypted prior to being hashed and anchored on-chain. The literature also notes that even hashed off-chain data may pose privacy risks when underlying documents use predictable content, allowing reconstruction through comparison with common inputs.

== Privacy versus auditing in blockchains ==
The emergence of privacy-focused cryptocurrencies such as Zcash and Monero has raised challenges for blockchain auditing, and some cryptocurrency exchanges have delisted or restricted privacy coins citing compliance concerns and regulatory pressure related to anti-money-laundering rules.

As privacy-enhancing designs can reduce the information available for oversight, researchers and policymakers often describe a trade-off between privacy and auditability in digital payment systems.
