= Junger =

Junger is a surname. Notable people with the surname include:

- Egidius Junger (1833–1895), German clergyman
- Ernst Junger (1895–1998), German soldier and author
- Gil Junger (born 1954), American director
- Paul Junger Witt (1941–2018), American producer
- Peter Junger (1933–2006), American computer law professor and Internet activist
- Sebastian Junger (born 1962), American author

== See also ==
- Junger v. Daley, court case brought by Peter D. Junger
- Junger Tag, German song title for the Eurovision Song Contest 1973
- Jünger (disambiguation)
- Jungers (disambiguation)
