= Brad Garlinghouse =

American businessman

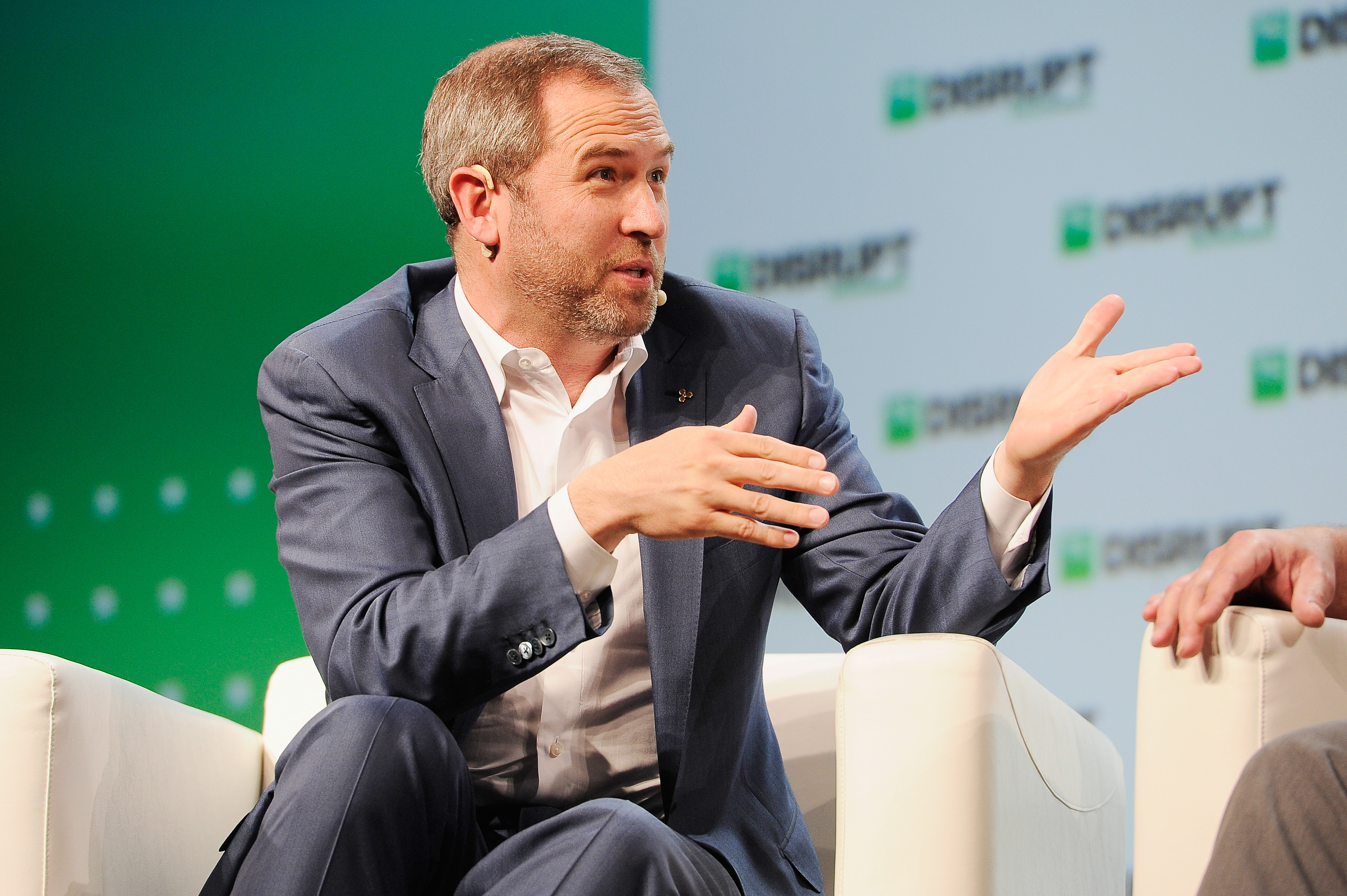
- Born: Bradley Kent Garlinghouse; February 6, 1971 (age 55); Topeka, Kansas
- Education: University of Kansas; Harvard Business School
- Occupation: CEO of Ripple Labs (2015–)

Bradley Kent Garlinghouse (born February 6, 1971) is an American businessman and the CEO of Ripple Labs, a financial technology company specializing in blockchain and cryptocurrency solutions. Previously, he was CEO and chairman of Hightail (formerly YouSendIt) and earlier in his career, he held executive roles at AOL and Yahoo.

He was born February 6, 1971, in Topeka, Kansas. Garlinghouse has a BA in economics from the University of Kansas and an MBA from Harvard Business School.

== Career ==
Garlinghouse had early stints at @Home Network and as a GP at @Ventures before joining Dialpad as CEO from 2000 to 2001. From 2003 to 2008, he was Senior Vice President at Yahoo! where he ran its Homepage, Flickr, Yahoo! Mail, and Yahoo! Messenger divisions. While at Yahoo! he penned an internal memo known as the "Peanut Butter Manifesto," calling for the company to focus on its core business, rather than spreading itself too thin, like peanut butter.

After Yahoo!, he was a Senior Advisor at Silver Lake Partners, and then went on to be President of Consumer Applications at AOL from 2009 to 2011. In April 2012, Garlinghouse joined the board of video startup Animoto. He joined Hightail and was its CEO until September 2014, leaving after a disagreement with the board regarding company direction.

Garlinghouse joined Ripple as COO in April 2015, reporting to then CEO and co-founder Chris Larsen. He was promoted to CEO in December 2016. In December 2019, Garlinghouse announced that Ripple had raised a $200M series C funding round from Tetragon, SBI Ventures and Route 66 Ventures. In 2020 Garlinghouse admitted that Ripple Labs would be losing money if it did not have the revenue generated from the sales of the XRP cryptocurrency.

In 2018 and 2019, Garlinghouse claimed on multiple occasions that the published error rate for SWIFT messaging was at least 6%. This was shown to be untrue by research published by the London School of Economics Business Review that showed Garlinghouse's claims were based on misreading of a paper published by SWIFT that did not refer to error rates in messaging.

The whitewashing of unflattering details from Garlinghouse's Wikipedia page was a subject of discussion in the Financial Times in August 2020.

On December 23, 2020, the U.S. Securities and Exchange Commission (SEC) issued a complaint alleging that Garlinghouse, Ripple Labs and Ripple Chairman Chris Larsen had committed multiple breaches of securities laws. While the case was pending, Garlinghouse criticized the SEC's lack of clarity on the status of Ripple's products, referring to SEC chairman Gary Gensler as an autocrat and tweeting, that "without clear jurisdiction, ambiguity masquerades as power". In July 2023, presiding judge Analisa Torres of the United States District Court for the Southern District of New York, held that the company's crypto token offering was "not a security", enabling the token to be relisted on exchanges. In November 2023, the SEC dropped all claims against Garlinghouse and Larsen. As a result of these, and other regulatory efforts by the SEC, cryptocurrency regulation became a wedge issue in the 2024 presidential election. This lead Garlinghouse and others to believe that the federal government's War on Crypto indirectly helped Trump become re-elected.

On April 21, 2026 Brad was awarded the Harvard Business School Business Leader of the Year award for 2026. He was interviewed on stage by the Ripple co-founder and Chairman, Chris Larsen. The event took place at the Julia Morgan Ballroom in San Francisco, in front of over 200 people.
