= Adrienne Harris =

American attorney and regulator

- Born: c. 1980 (age 45–46); United States
- Education: Georgetown University and Columbia Law School
- Occupations: Financial services regulator, attorney and policy executive
- Known for: Former Superintendent, New York State Department of Financial Services (NYDFS), 2021–2025

Adrienne A. Harris is an American attorney and regulator. She was appointed the fourth Superintendent of the New York State Department of Financial Services (DFS) from 2021 to 2025, known as "New York's Top Financial Regulator." Harris was nominated by New York Governor Kathy Hochul in August 2021 and confirmed by the New York State Senate in January 2022.

As Superintendent Harris was responsible for regulating 3,200 banking, insurance, and other financial institutions with nearly $10 trillion in combined assets. Harris was known for enacting strong consumer financial protection policy and regulating cryptocurrency.

== Career ==
=== Federal Government ===
Harris served as Special Assistant to the President for Economic Policy at the White House National Economic Council under President Barack Obama, where she worked on financial services policy. She also served as a senior advisor to Treasury Department Secretary Lew and Deputy Secretary Raskin from 2012 to 2015.

=== Private sector and academia ===
Harris practiced law at Sullivan & Cromwell LLP and later held executive roles at financial technology firm Doma, including General Counsel and Chief Business Officer.

She has also been affiliated with the University of Michigan’s Gerald R. Ford School of Public Policy as a faculty member.

After leaving public office in 2025, Harris returned to Sullivan & Cromwell LLP.

=== State Government - New York Superintendent of Financial Services ===
Harris was appointed Superintendent of the New York State Department of Financial Services in 2021 following the resignation of her predecessor and assumed office after confirmation in January 2022. The DFS is New York State's chief financial regulator, overseeing banking, insurance, and financial service industries.

During her tenure, Harris emphasized oversight of digital assets and financial technology, including strengthening regulation of cryptocurrency firms operating in New York. She also expanded staffing and enforcement capacity within the agency's virtual currency unit.

== Background ==
Harris earned a bachelor's degree from Georgetown University and a Juris Doctor from Columbia Law School.
