= Server-Gated Cryptography =

Defunct cryptography protocol

Server-Gated Cryptography (SGC), also known as International Step-Up by Netscape, is a defunct mechanism that was used to step up from 40-bit or 56-bit to 128-bit cipher suites with SSL. It was created in response to United States federal legislation on the export of strong cryptography in the 1990s. The legislation had limited encryption to weak algorithms and shorter key lengths in software exported outside of the United States of America. When the legislation added an exception for financial transactions, SGC was created as an extension to SSL with the certificates being restricted to financial organisations. In 1999, this list was expanded to include online merchants, healthcare organizations, and insurance companies. This legislation changed in January 2000, resulting in vendors no longer shipping export-grade browsers and SGC certificates becoming available without restriction.

Internet Explorer supported SGC starting with patched versions of Internet Explorer 3. SGC became obsolete when Internet Explorer 5.01 SP1 and Internet Explorer 5.5 started supporting strong encryption without the need for a separate high encryption pack (except on Windows 2000, which needs its own high encryption pack that was included in Service Pack 2 and later). "Export-grade" browsers are unusable on the modern Web due to many servers disabling export cipher suites. Additionally, these browsers are incapable of using SHA-2 family signature hash algorithms like SHA-256. Certification authorities are trying to phase out the new issuance of certificates with the older SHA-1 signature hash algorithm.

The continuing use of SGC facilitates the use of obsolete, insecure Web browsers with HTTPS. However, while certificates that use the SHA-1 signature hash algorithm remain available, some certificate authorities continue to issue SGC certificates (often charging a premium for them) although they are obsolete. The reason certificate authorities can charge a premium for SGC certificates is that browsers only allowed a limited number of roots to support SGC.

When an SSL handshake takes place, the software (e.g. a web browser) would list the ciphers that it supports. Although the weaker exported browsers would only include weaker ciphers in its initial SSL handshake, the browser also contained stronger cryptography algorithms. There are two protocols involved to activate them. Netscape Communicator 4 used International Step-Up, which used the now obsolete insecure renegotiation to change to a stronger cipher suite. Microsoft used SGC, which sends a new Client Hello message listing the stronger cipher suites on the same connection after the certificate is determined to be SGC capable, and also supported Netscape Step-Up for compatibility (though this support in the NT 4.0 SP6 and IE 5.01 version had a bug where changing MAC algorithms during Step-Up did not work properly).

== See also ==
- FREAK
