= Patent Busting Project =

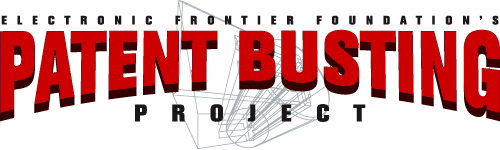
- Commercial?: No
- Type of project: Challenging illegitimate patents
- Owner: Electronic Frontier Foundation
- Established: April 19, 2004
- Website: eff.org/issues/patent-busting-project

The Patent Busting Project is an Electronic Frontier Foundation (EFF) initiative challenging patents that the organization claims are illegitimate and suppress innovation or limit online expression. The initiative launched on April 19, 2004 and involves two phases: documenting the damage caused by these patents, and submitting challenges to the United States Patent and Trademark Office (USPTO).

The EFF's basic assumption is that many such patents are invalid due to prior art which has historically been difficult to document in software and internet fields. (Many patent owners file patents to cover seemingly trivial concepts without any intention of enforcing the patents, but rather to use as part of a larger patent portfolio in their own defense against potential future patent lawsuits.)

== Status ==
The effort began with a "patent busting contest" where the public was encouraged to submit proposals of the worst offenders. Of these, EFF chose the top "10 Most Wanted" list of patents based on patent viability, whether the patent owners intend to enforce these patents, and how much of a threat they are to potential infringers.

By April 29, 2006, EFF had announced formal challenges to two of the listed patents: Test.com's patent on administering online tests, and Clear Channel's patent on recording and distributing CDs of live shows.

On October 23, 2007, The United States Patent and Trademark Office granted the EFF's request for the reexamination of NeoMedia's patent #6,199,048. The Office also granted request for the reexamination of Hoshiko's (Ideaflood) patent #6,687,746 that covers the automation of subdomain registration.

On February 4, 2009, The United States Patent and Trademark Office upheld NeoMedia patent #6,199,048, although with limitations imposed upon the claimed material.

== Ten Most-wanted Patents ==
- Acacia Research: Audio and video receiving and transmission system
- Clear Channel Entertainment: System and method of creating digital recordings of live performances
- Acceris: Method and apparatus for implementing a computer network/internet telephone system
- Sheldon F. Goldberg: System and method for playing games on a network
- Ideaflood: System apparatus and method for hosting and assigning domain names on a wide area network
- Neomedia Technologies: System and method for automatic access of a remote computer over a network
- Test.com: Method for administering tests, lessons, assessments
- Nintendo: Software implementation of a handheld videogame hardware platform
- Firepond: System that uses natural language processing to respond to customers' online inquiries by email
- Seer Systems: System and method for generating, distributing, storing and performing musical work files

=== Fate ===
EFF lists Acacia Research and Firepond's patents as having been made invalid, Ideaflood and Clear Channel's as "busted", NeoMedia and Seer Systems' have been "narrowed", Acceris, Test.com and Sheldon F. Goldberg's have "Reexam granted". Only Nintendo's patent of the original ten has no status update, but more are listed. Nintendo's patent has since expired in 2022.
