= Bernstein v. United States =

1990s legal case involving Snuffle encryption

Bernstein I
- Court: United States District Court for the Northern District of California
- Full case name: Daniel J. Bernstein et al., v. United States Department of State et al.
- Decided: April 15, 1996
- Citation: 922 F. Supp. 1426

Court membership
- Judge sitting: Marilyn Hall Patel

Bernstein II
- Court: United States District Court for the Northern District of California
- Full case name: Daniel J. Bernstein et al., v. United States Department of State et al.
- Decided: December 9, 1996
- Citation: 945 F. Supp. 1279

Court membership
- Judge sitting: Marilyn Hall Patel

Bernstein III
- Court: United States Court of Appeals for the Ninth Circuit
- Full case name: Daniel J. Bernstein et al., v. United States Department of State et al.
- Decided: May 6, 1999
- Citation: 176 F.3d 1132

Case history
- Prior action: Hon. Marilyn Hall Patel ruled for plaintiff in 974 F.Supp. 1288

Court membership
- Judges sitting: Betty Binns Fletcher, Myron H. Bright, Thomas G. Nelson

Case opinions
- Opinion by Fletcher; Concurrence by Bright; Dissent by Nelson

Bernstein v. United States was a series of court cases filed by Daniel J. Bernstein, then a mathematics Ph.D. student at the University of California, Berkeley, challenging U.S. government restrictions on the export of cryptographic software. In the early 1990s, the U.S. government classified encryption software as a "munition," imposing strict export controls. As a result, Bernstein was required to register as an arms dealer and obtain an export license before he could publish his encryption software online.

With the support of the Electronic Frontier Foundation (EFF), Bernstein filed a lawsuit against the U.S. government, arguing that the export controls violated his First Amendment rights. The case ultimately led to a relaxation of export restrictions on cryptography, which facilitated the development of secure international e-commerce. The decision has been recognized by First Amendment and technology advocacy groups for affirming a "right to code" and applying First Amendment protections to code as a form of expression.

== History ==
The case was first brought in 1995, when Bernstein was a student at University of California, Berkeley, and wanted to publish a paper and associated source code on his Snuffle encryption system. Bernstein was represented by the Electronic Frontier Foundation, who hired outside lawyer Cindy Cohn and also obtained pro bono publico assistance from Lee Tien of Berkeley; M. Edward Ross of the San Francisco law firm of Steefel, Levitt & Weiss; James Wheaton and Elizabeth Pritzker of the First Amendment Project in Oakland; and Robert Corn-Revere, Julia Kogan, and Jeremy Miller of the Washington, D.C., law firm of Hogan & Hartson. After four years and one regulatory change, the Ninth Circuit Court of Appeals ruled that software source code was speech protected by the First Amendment and that the government's regulations preventing its publication were unconstitutional. Regarding those regulations, the EFF states:

Years before, the government had placed encryption, a method for scrambling messages so they can only be understood by their intended recipients, on the United States Munitions List, alongside bombs and flamethrowers, as a weapon to be regulated for national security purposes. Companies and individuals exporting items on the munitions list, including software with encryption capabilities, had to obtain prior State Department approval.

— Electronic Frontier Foundation: EFF's History

The government requested en banc review. In Bernstein v. U.S. Dept. of Justice, 192 F.3d 1308 (9th Cir. 1999), the Ninth Circuit ordered that this case be reheard by the en banc court, and withdrew the three-judge panel opinion, Bernstein v. U.S. Dept. of Justice, 176 F.3d 1132 (9th Cir. 1999).

The government modified the regulations again, substantially loosening them, and Bernstein, then a professor at the University of Illinois Chicago, challenged them again. This time, he chose to represent himself, although he had no formal legal training. On October 15, 2003, almost nine years after Bernstein first brought the case, the judge dismissed it and asked Bernstein to come back when the government made a "concrete threat".

== Legacy ==
Apple cited Bernstein v. US in its refusal to hack the San Bernardino shooter's iPhone, arguing that they could not be compelled to "speak" (write code).

In 2022, Bernstein filed a second lawsuit against the U.S. government under the Freedom of Information Act, seeking records on the National Security Agency's role in influencing NIST's post-quantum cryptography standards, a case that remains ongoing as of 2025.

== See also ==
- Junger v. Daley
- PGP criminal investigation
- Salsa20 — successor to Snuffle 2005 encryption
