= Cindy Cohn =

American attorney

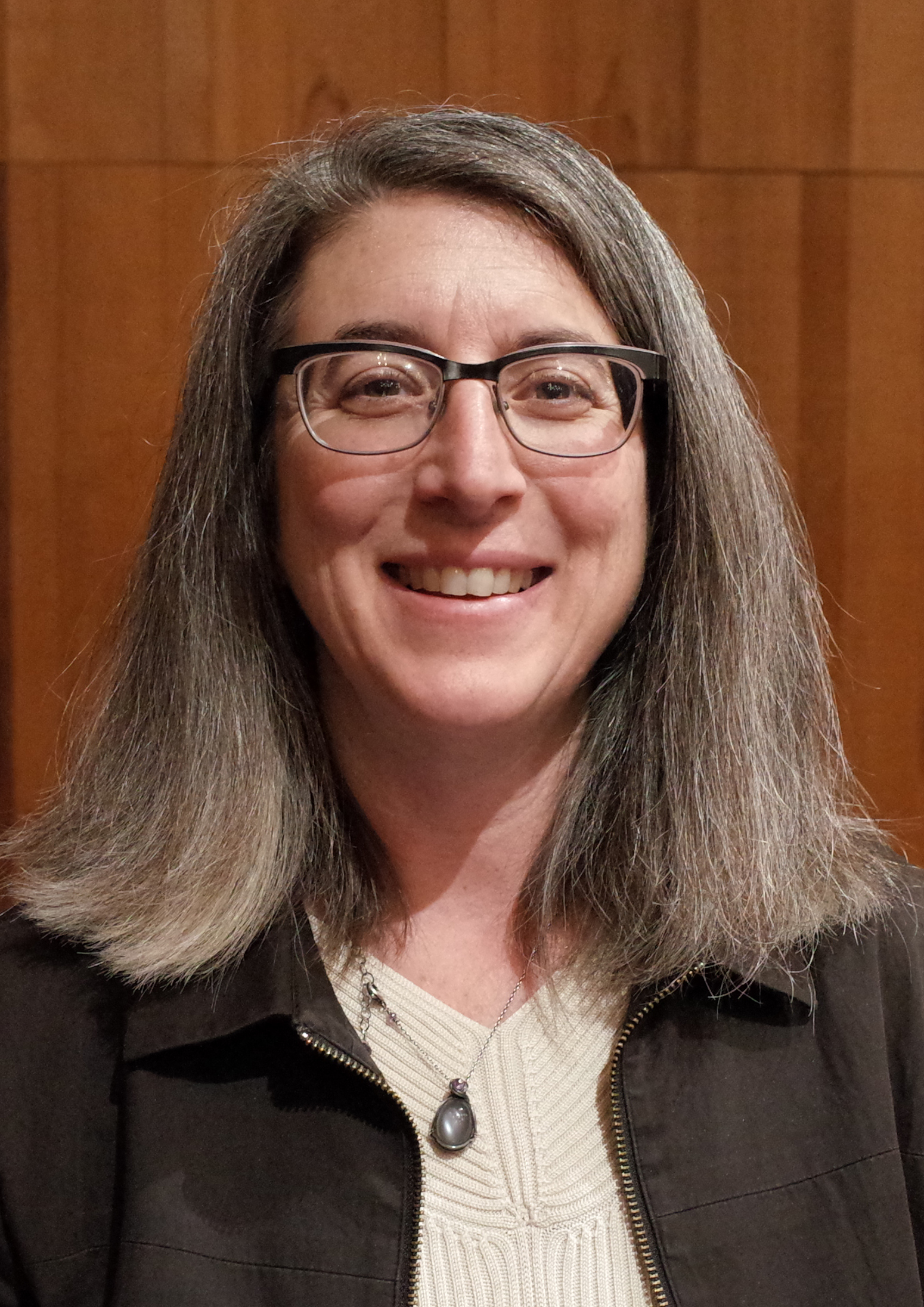
- Cindy Cohn photographed in Berkeley, California, in 2014
- Born: 1963 or 1964 (age 62–63); United States
- Education: University of Iowa; London School of Economics; University of Michigan

Cindy Cohn (born 1964 or 1965) is an American civil liberties attorney specializing in Internet law. She served as executive director for the Electronic Frontier Foundation (EFF) from 2015 to 2026. Cohn represented Daniel J. Bernstein and the EFF in Bernstein v. United States.

== Education ==
Cohn did her undegraduate studies at the University of Iowa and the London School of Economics, and earned a Doctor of Jurisprudence degree from the University of Michigan.

== Career ==
Cohn represented Daniel J. Bernstein and the EFF in Bernstein v. United States.

Some of Cohn's other significant cases include Hepting v. AT&T (class action against AT&T for collaborating with the National Security Agency program to wiretap and data-mine Americans' communications), In re Sony BMG Tech. litigation (class action against Sony BMG for placing dangerous digital rights management on customers' computers), Online Policy Group v. Diebold, Inc. (Diebold was held liable for sending out unfounded cease and desist notices to internet service providers in an effort to stop public discussion of the flaws in its electronic voting machines), and DVD Copy Control Ass'n v. Bunner (representing Andrew Bunner against the DVD Copy Control Association defending his right to republish a computer program that he found republished elsewhere on the Internet).

After serving for 15 years as legal director and general counsel for the Electronic Frontier Foundation, she became its executive director in 2015. Cohn has also served on the boards of directors of the nonprofit organizations Human Rights Advocates and the Verified Voting Foundation.

In September 2025, Cohn announced that she would be stepping down as EFF executive director by mid-2026. In March 2026, Nicole Ozer was announced as her successor, effective June 1.

== Selected publications ==
- "The Whistleblower Who Uncovered the NSA's 'Big Brother Machine'". The MIT Press Reader. April 30, 2026.
- Privacy's Defender: My Thirty-Year Fight Against Digital Surveillance. MIT Press, 2026. ISBN 9780262051248

== Awards and honors ==
In 1997, Cohn was recognized by California Lawyer as a "Lawyer of the Year". In 2006 and 2013, Cohn was named one of the 100 most influential lawyers in America by The National Law Journal. In November 2018, she was featured among "America's Top 50 Women In Tech" by Forbes.
