= Hightail =

Cloud service to send/receive and digitally sign files

- Industry: Technology
- Founded: 2004; 22 years ago
- Headquarters: San Mateo, California, US
- Parent: OpenText
- Website: www.hightail.com

Hightail, formerly YouSendIt, is a cloud service that lets users send, receive, digitally sign, and synchronize files. YouSendIt.com and YouSendIt Inc. were founded in 2004; the company renamed itself Hightail in 2013.

The company's early focus was on helping users send files that were too large for email; it started adding features and plug-ins for businesses in 2007. The service grew quickly, and the firm raised $49 million in funding between 2005 and 2010. The service can now be used via the web, a desktop client, mobile devices, or from within business applications using a Hightail plugin.

In May 2015, the company launched Hightail Spaces, designed to encourage creative professionals from conception of an idea to delivery.

In 2018, Hightail was acquired by OpenText.

== History ==
Hightail was founded as YouSendIt Inc. in 2004 by three cofounders: Ranjith Kumaram, Amir Shaikh and Khalid Shaikh. In its early years, Amir pursued advertising revenues, Jimmy Vienneau managed business development, Francis Wu created the graphic design including the logo, while Kumaran focused on the user experience and Khalid did technical work. By May 2004, the company had 300,000 users and was growing 30 percent each month. That September, Cambrian Ventures invested $250,000. At first, YouSendIt was mainly used to send large files, such as photos or audio files, which were too large for the file-size limits set by email providers at the time.

$5 million in funding was raised in August 2005. Afterwards, there was a falling out between the founders. Within a few years, Khalid and Amir Shaikh left the company, while Kumaran stayed in a product management and marketing role. In 2011, Shaikh pleaded guilty to making denial of service (DoS) attacks on the website for the YouSendIt service between December 2008 to June 2009.

Ivan Koon took over as CEO and YouSendIt continued to raise a total of $49 million. YouSendIt grew as file recipients saw how the service works, reaching 100,000 paying users and 8.5 million registered users by March 2009. In January 2011, YouSendIt Inc. acquired a developer of Microsoft Outlook add-ons, Attassa, and an iPhone app developer, Zosh.

In May 2012, a former AOL and Yahoo! executive, Brad Garlinghouse, was appointed as CEO. He refocused the company on file sharing and remote document access, placing it in competition with Dropbox Inc. and Box Inc. Hightail began advertising against competitors Dropbox and Box with slogans like "Your files should be neither Dropped nor Boxed".

In January 2013, YouSendIt acquired Found Software, a company that develops the Found for Mac application that searches for files on Macintosh computers and connected networks. In July of that year, YouSendIt announced its rebranding as Hightail, to represent its move beyond file sharing and into file collaboration services. New mobile apps for iOS and Windows devices were also introduced, as well as an unlimited storage option.

In September 2013, Hightail acquired adeptCloud, a security-focused file-sharing service for hosting files inside a corporate firewall. In November, Hightail raised $34 million in additional funding. Brad Garlinghouse resigned as CEO in September 2014, allegedly due to disagreements with the board of directors. He was replaced by co-founder Ranjith Kumaran.

In February 2018, Hightail was acquired by OpenText. In March 2018, Hightail's employees relocated to OpenText's offices in San Mateo, California and the Campbell office was decommissioned.

== Products and services ==
Hightail on iPhone

Users of the Hightail service upload a file to Hightail's servers, and recipients are provided with a link where the file can be downloaded. Users can also manage files in an online folder system, or create desktop folders that access online storage.

In addition to Hightail.com, the service can be used from desktop applications for Windows and macOS, or from mobile apps for iOS and Android devices. There are also plugins for business applications, such as Microsoft Outlook and Yahoo! Mail, that allow users to send files from within the application. Documents can be signed digitally with Hightail using a mouse or touch-screen. The service has a pay-per-use security feature and files sent through Hightail are encrypted during transit and while stored on individual devices or servers.

The consumer version is sold on a freemium basis, while a business product is sold as YouSendIt for Business, which was originally released as Workstream. YouSendIt for Business integrates with Active Directory and Microsoft SharePoint. The business version has additional features for corporate use, such as remote data wipes on mobile devices, service level agreements and controls for compliance requirements, such as HIPAA and PCI.

As of 2013, the company has more than 40 million registered users, in about 200 countries. Most use its free service for 2 GB of storage, while a half-million pay for unlimited storage and additional features.

=== Software versions ===
YouSendIt for Mac desktops in Beta - 2011

YouSendIt was initially known as a way for individuals to share personal files and images on YouSendIt.com. In 2007, a Corporate Suite was released that had management and reporting features for business users. The following year, a tool for embedding YouSendIt into third-party websites, called SiteDrop, was introduced.

Throughout 2008, YouSendIt added plugins that allowed files to be sent through YouSendIt from within applications like Final Cut Pro, Microsoft Outlook, and Adobe Acrobat. In May of that year, a new release of Yahoo! Mail included YouSendIt built-in, which added a million YouSendIt users over the following two months. In July, YouSendIt's online folder management system and digital signing features were introduced in order to compete with Dropbox. The following month, YouSendIt added applications for Mac and PC desktops, as well as iOS and Android devices.

In March 2012, YouSendIt released a separate product intended for business users called Workstream, which was later renamed to YouSendIt for Business.

== Reception ==
PC Magazine gave the service a 4/5 rating. The reviewer, Jeffrey Wilson, found its app easy to use and noted its digital signing and cloud storage features. Wilson reported problems when trying to use the digital signing feature with the phone held vertically and experienced occasional crashes. TopTenReviews gave the service a 9.5 out of 10. TopTenReviews praised the product for unlimited downloads and accessibility from a desktop, laptop or other mobile device. In benchmark tests, the service took seven minutes to upload a 30 MB file, compared to an industry average of six minutes.

According to a review in Small Business Trends, "Probably one of the most powerful features is the ability to sign digital documents." A review in About.com said the service was easy to use and noted its features for password protection, file-tracking and interface branding, but also pointed out that users cannot copy themselves on files sent through the Hightail Outlook application. A reviewer at MacLife liked its synchronization and collaboration tools, but had some complaints about a "clunky" user interface.

Referring to the "for Business" product, PC Advisor stated that Dropbox, had better customization, while YouSendIt had the advantage of integration with SharePoint and Active Directory for corporate environments. Enterprise Strategy Group (ESG) conducted a comparative review of vendors in the file sharing and collaboration market in 2012. It gave an average score from an end-user's perspective and a slightly below-average score from an administrator's perspective. ESG noted that the pricing model was expensive on a per-user basis, but its lack of caps or surcharges made it more affordable for heavy users. ESG testers found it easy and secure, but noted it lacked the auditing and workflow features of some competitors.

== See also ==
- Cloud storage
- Comparison of file hosting services
- Comparison of online backup services
- Smash
- WeTransfer
