= Jungers =

Jungers may refer to:

- Eugène Jacques Pierre Louis Jungers (1888–1958), Belgian Governor-General
- Benjamin Jungers (born 1986), French actor
- Jamie Jungers, woman associated with Tiger Woods
- John J. Jungers (1864–1947), American politician
- William L. Jungers (1948–2023), American anthropologist

== See also ==
- Jünger
- Junger (disambiguation)
