= Nicole Ozer =

American legal expert

- Education: Amherst College (BA, 1997); Berkeley Law (JD, 2003)
- Occupations: Attorney, legal expert
- Employer: Electronic Frontier Foundation

Nicole Ozer is an American legal expert in privacy and surveillance, artificial intelligence, and freedom of speech on the Internet. She serves as the executive director of the Electronic Frontier Foundation.

== Early life and education ==
Ozer attended Amherst College, graduating in 1997 with a bachelor's degree in American Studies. She studied abroad in South Africa, then returned to the US and enrolled at the UC Berkeley School of Law, where she served as executive editor for the Berkeley Technology Law Journal and co-president of the class of 2003, her graduation year.

== Career ==
Ozer served as a judicial clerk for the US District Court for the Northern District of California, and an intellectual property attorney at Morrison & Foerster LLP.

In 2003, Ozer was announced as the first director of the Technology and Civil Liberties Program at the ACLU of Northern California, a position she held until 2025. During her time with the ACLU, she partnered with the Electronic Frontier Foundation (EFF) on civil rights cases and other litigation. Her achievements included working toward the passage of the California Electronic Communications Privacy Act, which went into effect in 2016.

From 2018 to 2019, Ozer was a non-resident fellow at the Digital Civil Society Lab at the Stanford University Center on Philanthropy and Civil Society.

From 2024 to 2025, Ozer was a fellow at the Carr Center for Human Rights at the Harvard Kennedy School.

In September 2025, Ozer was announced as the inaugural executive director of the Center for Constitutional Democracy at the University of California College of the Law, San Francisco.

In January 2026, Ozer was appointed to the California Privacy Protection Agency Board by Robert A. Rivas, speaker of the California State Assembly.

In March 2026, Ozer was announced as the new executive director of the EFF, succeeding Cindy Cohn, effective June 1.

== Selected publications ==
- Ozer, Nicole A.; Gamble, Sean J. (March 2025). "Building Coalitions for Strategic Interventions to Improve Adolescent Health in the Technology Age". Journal of Adolescent Health. 76 (3): 343–345. doi:10.1016/j.jadohealth.2024.11.246.
- Ozer, Nicole A. (June 5, 2012). "Putting Online Privacy Above the Fold: Building a Social Movement and Creating Corporate Change". N.Y.U. Review of Law & Social Change. 36 (2).
