= Club Fed =

Derisive term for prison with resort-like conditions

"Club Fed" is a derisive term used in North America to refer to a prison whose accommodations are seen as less severe than many other prisons. Club Fed is a pun on the "Club Med" chain of all-inclusive resorts.

In Canada, the Joliette Institution for Women was nicknamed "Club Fed" because of the prison's supposedly luxurious conditions and lax restrictions, claims the prison has denied. Also in Canada, the William Head Institution in British Columbia is known as "Club Fed" due to its pastoral country setting which includes tennis courts, a baseball diamond, and a small golf course.

== See also ==
- List of U.S. federal prisons
- Alderson Federal Prison Camp
- Federal Prison Camp, Morgantown
- Incarceration in the United States § Security levels
- Danbury Federal Prison
