= Jünger =

Jünger is a surname. Notable people with the surname include:

- Ernst Jünger (1895–1998), German writer
- Friedrich Georg Jünger (1898–1977), German writer, brother of Ernst
- Robin Jünger (born 1976), German politician
- Sabine Jünger (born 1973), German politician

== See also ==
- Junger (disambiguation)
- Jungers (disambiguation)
