= Samourai Wallet =

Privacy-focused Bitcoin wallet

- Website: freesamourai.com

Samourai Wallet was a privacy-focused Bitcoin wallet that uses a Coinjoin tool that mixes a Bitcoin transaction with other transactions. It is open source and was released in 2015 and operated until 2024. In April 2024, it was targeted by the U.S. Department of Justice, alleging that the service enabled money laundering.

== Reception ==
Samourai wallet has been praised by privacy advocates and some Bitcoin developers who believe that it allows for censorship resistance and user sovereignty in transactions. However, it has also received criticism from U.S. federal regulators and law enforcement who argue that privacy tools are misused to allow illegal activity.

== Legal issues ==
In April 2024, the U.S. Department of Justice charged Keonne Rodriguez and William Lonergan Hill, the founders of Samourai Wallet, alleging the service furthered money laundering and constituted the operation of an unlicensed money transmitting business. The indictment alleged that Samourai's transaction mixing feature was used to launder $100 million in criminal proceeds.

The case sparked debate within the cryptocurrency and legal communities. A later-revealed DOJ memorandum acknowledged that the legality of crypto-mixing services was not fully settled under the current financial regulatory framework and that the tools are not inherently illegal. Critics of the prosecution described it as an attack on open source application development and financial privacy and made parallels to other historical examples of prosecution of privacy tools such as encryption software. The case also reportedly caused internal tensions between the DOJ and the Financial Crimes Enforcement Network (FinCEN), regarding the status of if these wallets are legally classified as money transmitters.

In July 2025, Rodriguez and Hill pleaded guilty to conspiracy to operate an unlicensed money transmitting business. They did not plead guilty to the money laundering charge. Sentencing was scheduled for November 2025. Rodriguez was sentenced on 6 November 2025 to 5 years prison, he was imposed a three-year period of probation after release and has to pay a $250,000 fine. On 19 November 2025 William Hill was sentenced to 4 years in prison and a fine of $250,000. On 16 January 2026 Patrick Witt, the executive director of the Digital Assets Council, announced that the nearly $6.4 million of Bitcoin which was seized from Samourai Wallet would be added to the U.S. federal government's strategic Bitcoin reserve.
