= Keonne Rodriguez =

American co-founder of Samourai Wallet

- Occupation: software developer
- Known for: Co-founder of Samourai Wallet
- Criminal penalty: Pending sentencing
- Website: freesamourai.com

Keonne Rodriguez is an American software developer and co-founder of Samourai Wallet, a Bitcoin Mixer designed to enhance transaction privacy for Bitcoin users. In 2024, Rodriguez and fellow co-founder William Lonergan Hill were arrested and later pled guilty to operating an unlicensed money-transmitting business for creating the software for the application. His prosecution drew criticism from privacy advocates and civil liberties groups, who argued that the case threatened financial privacy, open source development, and the principle of code as speech.

In December 2025, President Trump indicated that he would "look at" Rodriguez' case and potentially issue a pardon to him.

== Background ==
In 2015, Rodriguez co-founded Samourai wallet as a non-custodial wallet that enabled privacy for on-chain bitcoin transactions through features such as Whirlpool, a coin-mixing service that mixes one bitcoin transactions with other transactions. In explaining how the service worked, Rodriguez stated, "I think the best analogy for it is like smelting gold. You take your bitcoin, you add it into [the conjoin protocol] Whirlpool, and Whirlpool smelts it into new pieces that are not associated to the original piece."

== Legal issues ==
On April 24, 2024, the U.S. Department of Justice announced the arrests of Rodriguez and Hill. Prosecutors of the Southern District of New York alleged that the creation of Samourai wallet source code constituted the operation of an unlicensed money-transmitting business and conspiracy to commit money laundering. They alleged that by allowing users to conceal $2 billion in bitcoin transactions, Rodriguez and Hill were engaging in criminal activity. The DOJ claims that $100 million in illicit funds were laundered through the service.

In July 2025, Rodriguez and Hill pleaded guilty to just the charge of unlicensed money transmission. Rodriguez' sentencing was scheduled for November 2025. On November 6, 2025, he was sentenced to 5 years prison and was imposed a three-year period of probation after release. He has to pay a $250,000 fine and both Rodriguez and Hill agreed to forfeit just under $238 million combined.

== Reactions to prosecution ==
Privacy advocates have denounced Rodriguez' federal prosecution, stating that Samourai wallet protects its users' financial privacy, which they regard as a fundamental human right. Critics of the prosecution assert that financial privacy is essential to protect against state surveillance and control of financial transactions and other personal activities. Supporters of Rodriguez also hold that the creation and publication of Samourai's source code are forms of protected speech under the "code as speech" doctrine, established by Bernstein v. United States, emphasizing that Rodriguez merely wrote and distributed computer code. The Cato Institute argued that this prosecution could have a chilling effect on "cryptocurrency defenders, human rights activists, privacy defenders, and software developers," noting that this has already spurred Wasabi Wallet to block U.S. users and led to the removal of Phoenix Wallet from American app stores. Other supporters have cited the 2024 TD bank money laundering scandal, in which the Justice Department collected the largest penalty ever under the Bank Secrecy Act after finding bank employees accepted bribes to facilitate money laundering, resulting in financial penalties without jail penalties. Bitcoin users have also criticized Rodriguez' prosecution since many used the tool to improve privacy in their transactions.

In September 2024, following the shutdown of Samourai, a group of developers created the Ashigaru wallet, an open-source wallet based on the Samourai code. In December 2025, President Donald Trump indicated he would look at the case and potentially issue Rodriguez a pardon.

Rodriguez has also commented extensively on his case, stating that "more builders in the space should be looking at what the government has done here, and really shoring up their defenses," believing that other Bitcoin developers will be targeted next. He believes Bitcoin miners will be then next targets of money transmission enforcement if the Samourai wallet decision is taken to its "logical conclusion."

== See also ==
- Tornado Cash
