= Tornado Cash =

Virtual currency mixer on the Ethereum blockchain

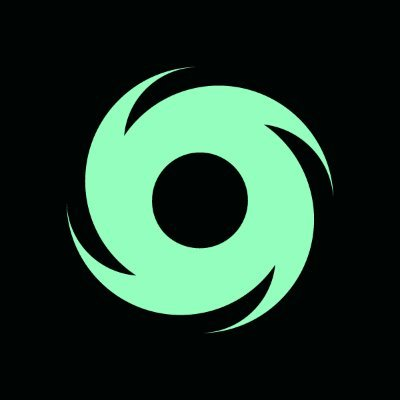
- The Tornado Cash logo
- Developer(s): Roman Semenov, Alexey Pertsev, Roman Storm
- Initial release: 17 December 2019
- Stable release: v3 / 16 December 2021
- Development status: Discontinued
- Written in: Solidity
- Platform: Ethereum Virtual Machine
- Type: Cryptocurrency tumbler
- License: Open-source licenses

Tornado Cash (also stylized as TornadoCash) is an open source, non-custodial, fully decentralized cryptocurrency tumbler that runs on Ethereum Virtual Machine-compatible networks. It offers a service that mixes potentially identifiable or "tainted" cryptocurrency funds with others, so as to obscure the trail back to the fund's original source. This is a privacy tool used in EVM networks where all transactions are public by default.

In August 2022, the U.S. Department of the Treasury blacklisted the protocol, making it illegal for US citizens, residents and companies to use it. The project's web domain and GitHub accounts were also shut down, and one of the developers of the software was arrested. On November 26, 2024 a US Federal Appeals court overturned an earlier ruling stating that the law could not sanction a protocol.

The project is governed through a decentralized autonomous organization (DAO) and uses the $TORN token as a voting system for protocol updates.

== Functionality ==
Tornado Cash uses multiple smart contracts that accept different quantities of ETH and ERC-20 deposits. These deposits can later be withdrawn to a different address by providing a cryptographic proof, hence breaking the link in the chain between the sender and the recipient.

== History ==
Tornado Cash was created in 2019, and was alleged by the U.S. Department of the Treasury to have been "used to launder more than $96 million of malicious cyber actors' funds derived from the June 24, 2022 Harmony Bridge Heist". On 8 August 2022, the Office of Foreign Assets Control of the U.S. Department of the Treasury blacklisted Tornado Cash, making it illegal for United States citizens, residents, and companies to receive or send money through the service. The Treasury Department accused it of laundering more than $7 billion in virtual currencies, including $455 million believed to have been stolen in 2022 by the Lazarus Group, a hacking group associated with the government of North Korea. The same day, the domain used by the project was taken down, and GitHub removed the Tornado Cash repository and suspended the developers' accounts.

Circle, the company behind USD Coin, froze about $75,000 in USDC from Ethereum addresses belonging to the mixer.

On 10 August 2022, Tornado Cash developer Alexey Pertsev was arrested in Amsterdam on the suspicion of "involvement in concealing criminal financial flows and facilitating money laundering through the mixing of cryptocurrencies through the decentralised Ethereum mixing service Tornado Cash".

The Electronic Frontier Foundation on April 11, 2023, announced that it was opposed to the legal actions stating: "governmental actions targeting the publication of code based upon its topic necessarily target speech" as well as raising concerns about financial privacy.

On May 21, 2023, a hacker used a malicious proposal to gain full control of Tornado Cash's DAO. The hacker put forth a proposal for the DAO to vote on with hidden code that would issue the fraudulent voting tokens to them. The vote was passed, giving the hacker enough voting tokens to control any future proposals. On May 26th, the hacker effectively relinquished control, but had converted a portion of the stolen governance tokens to Ether valued at around $900,000, and laundered them through the service.

On August 23, 2023, two more Tornado developers, Roman Storm and Roman Semenov, were charged with assisting in money laundering in the amount of $1 billion. Roman Storm was arrested in Washington State. On May 14, 2024, Alexey Pertsev was sentenced by a court in the Netherlands to 5 years and 4 months in prison for his role in Tornado Cash development. A trial of Pertsev was also pending as of that date in the United States District Court for the Southern District of New York. Pertsev appealed the conviction. In February 2025, he announced that a Dutch court had suspended his pretrial detention on condition of electronic monitoring so that he could work on his appeal.

On November 26, 2024, the United States Court of Appeals for the Fifth Circuit ruled that the immutable smart contracts used by Tornado Cash do not qualify as "property" under federal law, and that the Office of Foreign Assets Control lacked authority to sanction Tornado Cash software directly, "as opposed to the rogue persons and entities who abuse it".

On March 21, 2025 the economic sanctions against Tornado Cash have been lifted by the U.S. Department of the Treasury, who "remain deeply concerned about North Korea's state-sponsored hacking and money laundering campaign," and "will continue to monitor closely any transactions that may benefit malicious cyber actors." The prosecution of Tornado Cash founder Roman Storm continues to be ongoing in the Trump Administration with chief legal officer of the crypto firm Variant stating, "This really is a vestige of the Biden administration's war on crypto," and that, "It's shocking the case is still moving forward."

Roman Storm faced trial July 14, 2025, having received more than $2.5 million in donations for legal defense. The trial was set to be overseen by Jay Clayton. After a three week trial, Storm was found guilty of conspiracy to operate an unlicensed money transmitting business, one of the three criminal charges he had faced.

The bad actors responsible for the late October 2026 $6.3B Binance hack received funding via Tornado Cash.
