= Cryptocurrency tumbler =

Service that attempts to obscure cryptocurrency money trails

A cryptocurrency tumbler or cryptocurrency mixing service is a service that mixes potentially identifiable or "tainted" cryptocurrency funds with others, so as to obscure the trail back to the fund's original source. This is usually done by pooling together source funds from multiple inputs for a large and random period of time, and then spitting them back out to destination addresses. As all the funds are lumped together and then distributed at random times, it is very difficult to trace exact coins. Tumblers have arisen to improve the anonymity of cryptocurrencies, usually bitcoin (hence bitcoin mixer), since the digital currencies provide a public ledger of all transactions. Due to its goal of anonymity, tumblers have been used to money launder cryptocurrency.

== Background ==
Tumblers take a percentage transaction fee of the total coins mixed to turn a profit, typically 1–3%. Mixing helps protect privacy and can also be used for money laundering by mixing illegally obtained funds. Mixing large amounts of money may be illegal, being in violation of anti-structuring laws. Financial crimes author Jeffrey Robinson has suggested tumblers should be criminalized due to their potential use in illegal activities, specifically funding terrorism; however, a report from the CTC suggests such use in terrorism-related activities is "relatively limited". There has been at least one incident where an exchange has blacklisted "tainted" deposits descending from stolen bitcoins.

The existence of tumblers has made the anonymous use of darknet markets easier and the job of law enforcement harder.

== Peer-to-peer tumblers ==
Peer-to-peer tumblers act as a place of meeting for bitcoin users, instead of taking bitcoins for mixing. Users arrange mixing by themselves. This model solves the problem of stealing, as there is no middleman. When it is completely formed, the exchange of bitcoins between the participants begins. Apart from mixing server, none of the participants can know the connection between the incoming and outgoing addresses of coins.

== Money laundering ==
In December 2013, cryptocurrency tumbler Bitcoin Fog was used to launder a part of the 96,000 BTC from the robbery of Sheep Marketplace.

In February 2015, a total of 7,170 Bitcoin was stolen from the Chinese exchange Bter.com and traced back to the same tumbler.

In May 2019, FinCEN published a Guidance document that mentioned anonymizing services and mentioned particularly "tumblers".

In February 2020, the alleged operator of a cryptocurrency tumbler was indicted on charges of "money laundering conspiracy, operating an unlicensed money transmitting business and conducting money transmission without a D.C. license."

In January 2021, the Department of Justice conducted an operation targeting the ransomware hacker NetWalker, successfully confiscating around $500,000 in digital assets. Then, in February 2021, they apprehended three hackers affiliated with the North Korean military, recovering $2 million in illicitly acquired digital assets.

In April 2021, U.S. Federal authorities arrested the founder of Bitcoin Fog, a Russian-Swedish man named Roman Sterlingov, on charges of money laundering, operating an unlicensed money transmitting business, and money transmission without a license in the District of Columbia. It was alleged that during its 10 years of operation, Bitcoin Fog laundered over 1.2 million Bitcoin at a value of approximately $335 million. In March 2024 the verdict came back guilty on all counts. Roman's counsel plan to appeal the verdict. In November 2024, Sterlingov was sentenced to 150 months in prison. He was ordered to pay a forfeiture money judgment in the amount of $395,563,025.39, and forfeiture of seized cryptocurrencies and monetary assets valued at approximately $1.76 million. In addition, Roman was ordered to forfeit his interest in the Bitcoin Fog wallet, totaling approximately 1,345 bitcoin and currently valued at more than $103 million.

In 2022, the tumblers Blender.io and Tornado Cash were both sanctioned by the United States Department of the Treasury, making it illegal for US citizens, residents and companies to use the service. The Treasury lifted the sanctions on Tornado Cash in March 2025.

In March 2023, the tumbler ChipMixer and 46 million dollars in Bitcoin were seized.

In October 2023 FinCEN proposed a rule that would label international mixing of convertible virtual currency a class of transactions of primary money laundering concern. This was the first time FinCEN had used its Section 311 authority to target a class of transactions.

In November 2023 the Office of Foreign Assets Control sanctioned Sinbad.io, a Bitcoin mixer that the Treasury described as a key money-laundering tool of the Lazarus Group. The Treasury identified the group as a state-sponsored hacking group of the Democratic People's Republic of Korea and said Sinbad.io had processed funds from its Horizon Bridge and Axie Infinity heists.

In April 2024, Keonne Rodriguez and William Lonergan Hill, the founders of Samourai Wallet, a privacy-focused Coinjoin tool that mixes a Bitcoin transaction with other transactions, were criminally charged by the DOJ. The DOJ alleged that providing these private, anonymous transactions enabled money laundering. In July 2025 both pleaded guilty to conspiring to operate an unlicensed money-transmitting business. In November 2025 Rodriguez was sentenced to five years in prison and Hill to four years.

In late November 2025 German and Swiss authorities seized the servers of "cryptomixer.io", took the website down and confiscated some 25 million Euro in Crypto currencies. No arrests were announced but the contents of several mail accounts was secured. The operators are being investigated for money laundering.

== See also ==
- Anonymity
- Code as speech
- Cryptocurrency and crime
- Money laundering
- Privacy and blockchain
