= Junger v. Daley =

Precedent-setting American court case about freedom to publish encryption software

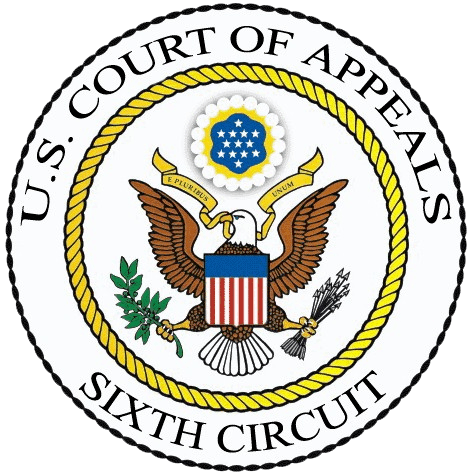
- Court: United States Court of Appeals for the Sixth Circuit
- Full case name: Peter D. Junger v. William Daley, United States Secretary of Commerce, et al..
- Decided: April 04, 2000
- Citation: 209 F.3d 481

Case history
- Appealed from: United States District Court for the Northern District of Ohio

Case opinions
- Concluded that the First Amendment protects computer source code.
- Decision by: Boyce F. Martin Jr.

Junger v. Daley is a landmark court case brought by Peter Junger challenging restrictions on the export of encryption software outside of the United States. The Sixth Circuit court ruled that source code is protected by the First Amendment.

The case was first brought in 1996 (as Junger v. Christopher) to an Ohio district court, when Junger was a professor at Case Western Reserve University and wanted to teach a class on computer law. Due to restrictions on export of encryption software which classified it as "munition," he would be unable to discuss technical details of encryption with foreign nationals, restricting his ability to accept foreign students into his class. His case, supported by the ACLU of Ohio, argued that the regulations restricted his freedom of speech under the First Amendment.

Following a district court victory in the Bernstein v. United States case on a similar matter, Junger amended his complaint to ask for an injunction on enforcement of the regulations that prohibited him from publishing his course materials on the Internet. The Ohio district court ruled that source code, being "inherently functional", did not qualify for First Amendment protection. On appeal, the Sixth Circuit found that all source code is protected by the First Amendment, noting that source code "is an expressive means for the exchange of information and ideas about computer programming" and that its functional qualities do not preclude constitutional protection.

The case is the highest level precedent that holds that computer programs are protected by the First Amendment.

== See also ==
- Export of cryptography
- Bernstein v. United States
