= Dialpad Meetings =

Dialpad Meetings (formerly UberConference)
- Industry: Telephony
- Founded: 2012
- Headquarters: San Francisco, California
- Key people: Craig Walker, CEO
- Products: Dialpad Meetings
- Number of employees: 1000+
- Website: www.dialpad.com/meetings/

Dialpad Meetings (formerly UberConference) is a cloud-based video conferencing system from Dialpad, a privately held company in San Francisco, California. The company, formerly known as Firespotter Labs, was co-founded by Craig Walker one year after he was the first Entrepreneur-in-Residence at Google Ventures.

== History ==
UberConference was launched in May 2012 at TechCrunch Disrupt, the annual trade conference run by technology news source TechCrunch. UberConference was chosen as the best new product from a group of 30 startup entrants.

UberConference's development was funded by an initial investment of $3 million in Firespotter from Google Ventures, and another $15 million in the fall of 2013 by Andreessen Horowitz and Google Ventures. It is also a portfolio company of Kleiner Perkins Caufield & Byers

On June 30, 2022, UberConference officially joined the Dialpad family of products and was renamed to Dialpad Meetings.
