= Export of cryptography from the United States =

Transfer from the United States to another country of technology related to cryptography

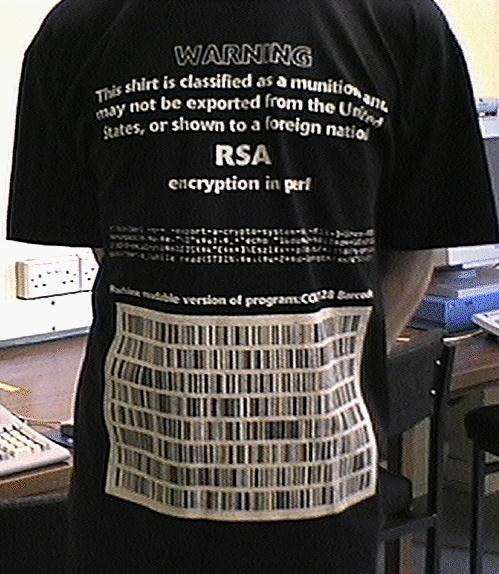
Export-restricted RSA encryption source code printed on a T-shirt made the T-shirt an export-restricted munition, as a freedom of speech protest against U.S. encryption export restrictions (Back side). Changes in the export law means that it is no longer illegal to export this T-shirt from the U.S., or for U.S. citizens to show it to foreigners.

The export of cryptography from the United States to other countries has experienced various levels of restrictions over time. World War II illustrated that code-breaking and cryptography can play an integral part in national security and the ability to prosecute war. Changes in technology and the preservation of free speech have been competing factors in the regulation and constraint of cryptographic technologies for export.

== History ==
=== Cold War era ===
In the early days of the Cold War, the U.S. and its allies developed an elaborate series of export control regulations designed to prevent a wide range of Western technology from falling into the hands of others, particularly the Eastern bloc. All export of technology classed as 'critical' required a license. CoCom was organized to coordinate Western export controls.

Two types of technology were protected: technology associated only with weapons of war ("munitions") and dual use technology, which also had commercial applications. In the U.S., dual use technology export was controlled by the Department of Commerce, while munitions were controlled by the State Department. Since in the immediate post WWII period the market for cryptography was almost entirely military, the encryption technology (techniques as well as equipment and, after computers began to play a larger role in modern life, crypto software) was included as "Category XI - Miscellaneous Articles" and later "Category XIII - Auxiliary Military Equipment" item into the United States Munitions List on November 17, 1954. The multinational control of the export of cryptography on the Western side of the cold war divide was done via the mechanisms of CoCom.

By the 1960s, however, financial organizations were beginning to require strong commercial encryption on the rapidly growing field of wired money transfer. The U.S. Government's introduction of the Data Encryption Standard in 1975 meant that commercial uses of high quality encryption would become common, and serious problems of export control began to arise. Generally these were dealt with through case-by-case export license request proceedings brought by computer manufacturers, such as IBM, and by their large corporate customers.

=== PC era ===
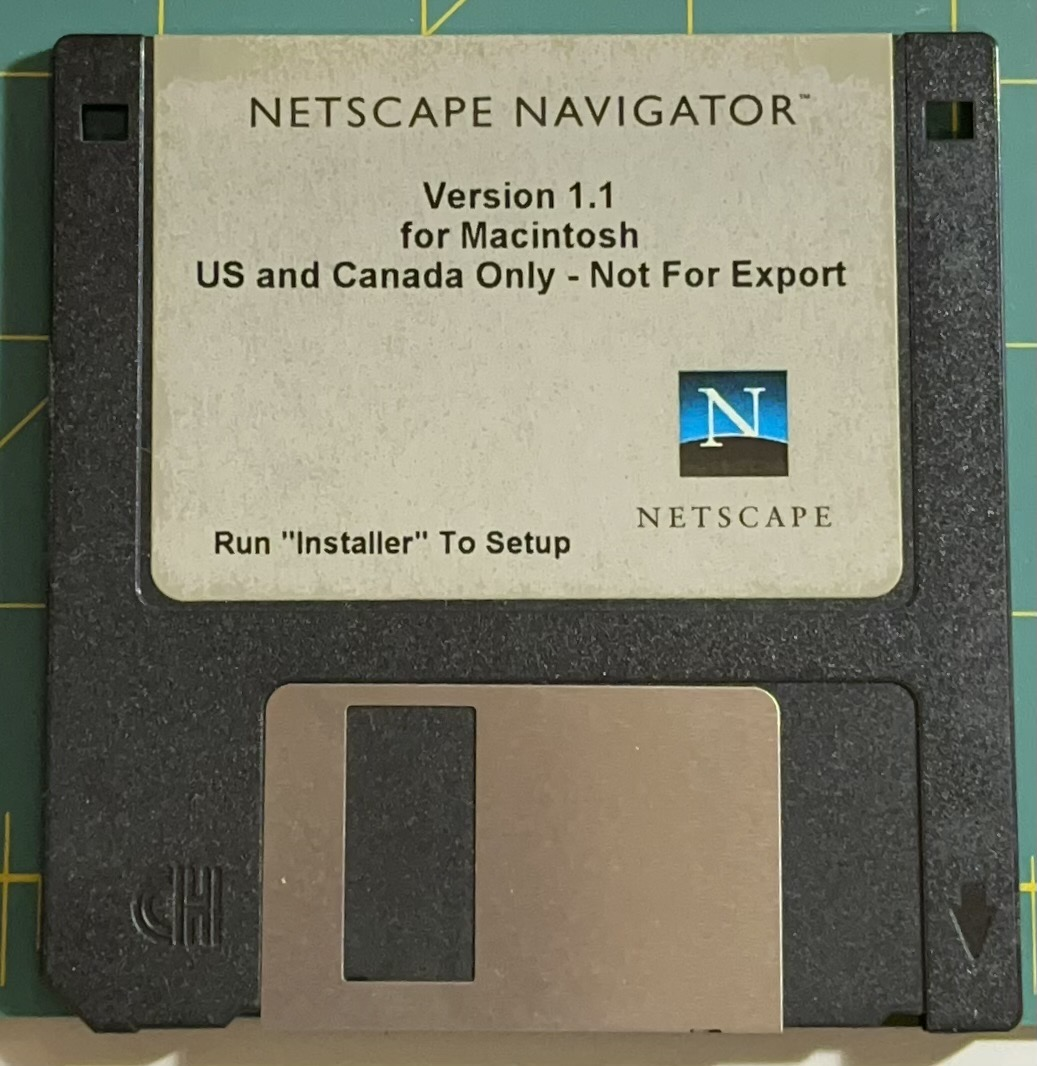
Netscape Navigator Install Disk stating "US and Canada Only - Not For export". Since 1954 (ITAR times) Canada is specifically and uniquely exempted from requirements for export licenses for cryptography.

Encryption export controls became a matter of public concern with the introduction of the personal computer. Phil Zimmermann's PGP encryption software and its distribution on the Internet in 1991 was the first major 'individual level' challenge to controls on export of cryptography. The growth of electronic commerce in the 1990s created additional pressure for reduced restrictions. VideoCipher II also used DES to scramble satellite TV audio.

In 1989, non-encryption use of cryptography (such as access control and message authentication) was removed from export control with a Commodity Jurisdiction. In 1992, an exception was formally added in the USML for non-encryption use of cryptography (and satellite TV descramblers) and a deal between NSA and the Software Publishers Association made 40-bit RC2 and RC4 encryption easily exportable using a Commodity Jurisdiction with special "7-day" and "15-day" review processes (which transferred control from the State Department to the Commerce Department). At this stage Western governments had, in practice, a split personality when it came to encryption; policy was made by the military cryptanalysts, who were solely concerned with preventing their 'enemies' acquiring secrets, but that policy was then communicated to commerce by officials whose job was to support industry.

Shortly afterward, Netscape's SSL technology was widely adopted as a method for protecting credit card transactions using public key cryptography. Netscape developed two versions of its web browser. The "U.S. edition" supported full size (typically 1024-bit or larger) RSA public keys in combination with full size symmetric keys (secret keys) (128-bit RC4 or 3DES in SSL 3.0 and TLS 1.0). The "International Edition" had its effective key lengths reduced to 512 bits and 40 bits respectively (RSA_EXPORT with 40-bit RC2 or RC4 in SSL 3.0 and TLS 1.0). Acquiring the 'U.S. domestic' version turned out to be sufficient hassle that most computer users, even in the U.S., ended up with the 'International' version, whose weak 40-bit encryption can currently be broken in a matter of days using a single computer. A similar situation occurred with Lotus Notes for the same reasons.

Legal challenges by Peter Junger and other civil libertarians and privacy advocates, the widespread availability of encryption software outside the U.S., and the perception by many companies that adverse publicity about weak encryption was limiting their sales and the growth of e-commerce, led to a series of relaxations in US export controls, culminating in 1996 in President Bill Clinton signing the Executive Order 13026 transferring the commercial encryption from the Munition List to the Commerce Control List. Furthermore, the order stated that, "the software shall not be considered or treated as 'technology'" in the sense of Export Administration Regulations. The Commodity Jurisdiction process was replaced with a Commodity Classification process, and a provision was added to allow export of 56-bit encryption if the exporter promised to add "key recovery" backdoors by the end of 1998. In 1999, the EAR was changed to allow 56-bit encryption (based on RC2, RC4, RC5, DES or CAST) and 1024-bit RSA to be exported without any backdoors, and new SSL cipher suites were introduced to support this (RSA_EXPORT1024 with 56-bit RC4 or DES). In 2000, the Department of Commerce implemented rules that greatly simplified the export of commercial and open source software containing cryptography, including allowing the key length restrictions to be removed after going through the Commodity Classification process (to classify the software as "retail") and adding an exception for publicly available encryption source code.

=== Current status ===
As of 2009, non-military cryptography exports from the U.S. are controlled by the Department of Commerce's Bureau of Industry and Security. Some restrictions still exist, even for mass market products; particularly with regards to export to "rogue states" and terrorist organizations. Militarized encryption equipment, TEMPEST-approved electronics, custom cryptographic software, and even cryptographic consulting services still require an export license. Furthermore, encryption registration with the BIS is required for the export of "mass market encryption commodities, software and components with encryption exceeding 64 bits" (75 FR 36494). For elliptic curves algorithms and asymmetric algorithms, the requirements for key length are 128 bit and 768 bits, respectively. In addition, other items require a one-time review by, or notification to, BIS prior to export to most countries. For instance, the BIS must be notified before open-source cryptographic software is made publicly available on the Internet, though no review is required. Export regulations have been relaxed from pre-1996 standards, but are still complex. Other countries, notably those participating in the Wassenaar Arrangement, have similar restrictions. On March 29, 2021, the Implementation of Wassenaar Arrangement 2019 Plenary Decisions was published in the Federal Register. This rule included changes to license exception ENC Section 740.17 of the EAR.

== U.S. export rules ==
U.S. non-military exports are controlled by Export Administration Regulations (EAR), a short name for the U.S. Code of Federal Regulations (CFR) Title 15 chapter VII, subchapter C.

Encryption items specifically designed, developed, configured, adapted or modified for military applications (including command, control and intelligence applications) are controlled by the Department of State on the United States Munitions List.

=== Terminology ===
Encryption export terminology is defined in EAR part 772.1. In particular:

- Encryption Component is an encryption commodity or software (but not the source code), including encryption chips, integrated circuits etc.
- Encryption items include non-military encryption commodities, software, and technology.
- Open cryptographic interface is a mechanism which is designed to allow a customer or other party to insert cryptographic functionality without the intervention, help or assistance of the manufacturer or its agents.
- Ancillary cryptography items are the ones primarily used not for computing and communications, but for digital rights management; games, household appliances; printing, photo and video recording (but not videoconferencing); business process automation; industrial or manufacturing systems (including robotics, fire alarms and HVAC); automotive, aviation and other transportation systems.

Export destinations are classified by the EAR Supplement No. 1 to Part 740 into four country groups (A, B, D, E) with further subdivisions; a country can belong to more than one group. For the purposes of encryption, groups B, D:1, and E:1 are important:

- B is a large list of countries that are subject to relaxed encryption export rules
- D:1 is a short list of countries that are subject to stricter export control. Notable countries on this list include China and Russia.
- E:1 is a very short list of "terrorist-supporting" and unilaterally embargoed countries (as of 2026, includes four countries (Cuba, Iran, North Korea, and Syria); previously contained six countries and was also called "terrorist 6" or T-6)

The EAR Supplement No. 1 to Part 738 (Commerce Country Chart) contains the table with country restrictions. If a line of table that corresponds to the country contains an X in the reason for control column, the export of a controlled item requires a license, unless an exception can be applied. For the purposes of encryption, the following three reasons for control are important:

- NS1 National Security Column 1
- AT1 Anti-Terrorism Column 1
- EI Encryption Items is currently same as NS1

=== Classification ===
For export purposes each item is classified with the Export Control Classification Number (ECCN) with the help of the Commerce Control List (CCL, Supplement No. 1 to the EAR part 774). In particular:

- 5A002 Systems, equipment, electronic assemblies, and integrated circuits for "information security. Reasons for Control: NS1, AT1.
- 5A992 "Mass market" encryption commodities and other equipment not controlled by 5A002. Reason for Control: AT1.
- 5B002 Equipment for development or production of items classified as 5A002, 5B002, 5D002 or 5E002. Reasons for Control: NS1, AT1.
- 5D002 Encryption software. Reasons for control: NS1, AT1.
  - used to develop, produce, or use items classified as 5A002, 5B002, 5D002
  - supporting technology controlled by 5E002
  - modeling the functions of equipment controlled by 5A002 or 5B002
  - used to certify software controlled by 5D002
- 5D992 Encryption software not controlled by 5D002. Reasons for control: AT1.
- 5E002 Technology for the development, production or use of equipment controlled by 5A002 or 5B002 or software controlled by 5D002. Reasons for control: NS1, AT1.
- 5E992 Technology for the 5x992 items. Reasons for control: AT1.

An item can be either self-classified, or a classification ("review") requested from the BIS. A BIS review is required for typical items to get the 5A992 or 5D992 classification.

== See also ==
- Bernstein v. United States
- Code as speech
- Denied trade screening
- Export control
- Junger v. Daley
- Restrictions on the import of cryptography
- FREAK
- Crypto wars
