= Peter Junger =

American computer law professor (1933–2006)

Peter D. Junger (1933 – November 2006) was a cyberlaw professor and internet activist, most famous for having fought against the U.S. government's regulations of and export controls on encryption software.

The case Junger v. Daley (6th Cir. 2000), held that computer source code is protected by the First Amendment. The US government prohibited publication of encryption software on the internet, arguing that encryption software was a "munition" subject to export controls. Junger filed suit in 1996, challenging the regulations.

Junger also did significant legal theoretical work on the interplay between intellectual property, computer law, and the First Amendment, defining himself as a "First Amendment absolutist".

== Biography ==
Junger grew up in Wyoming, graduating from Harvard University in 1955 and Harvard Law School in 1958. From January 1959 to December 1960, he was an enlisted man in the U.S. Army, serving in West Germany. After practicing law from 1961 to 1970, he accepted a faculty position at Case Western Reserve University's School of Law. He retired and became Professor of Law Emeritus in 2001.

Junger died in November 2006, aged 73, at his home in Cleveland.
