= Electronic Frontier Foundation =

Digital rights group

- Logo since July 2018
- Abbreviation: EFF
- Formation: 1990 (36 years ago)
- Founders: Mitch Kapor; John Gilmore; John Perry Barlow
- Type: Nonprofit
- Tax ID no.: 04-3091431
- Purpose: Digital rights
- Headquarters: San Francisco, California, US
- Region served: Worldwide
- Members: 40,000
- Executive director: Nicole Ozer
- Revenue: 26.1 million (2025)
- Expenses: 27.1 million (2025)
- Endowment: 22.5 million (2025)
- Staff: 125 (2025)
- Volunteers: 332 (2025)
- Website: eff.org

The Electronic Frontier Foundation (EFF) is an American international non-profit digital rights group based in San Francisco, California. It was founded in 1990 to promote Internet civil liberties.

It provides funds for legal defense in court, presents amicus curiae briefs, defends individuals and new technologies from what it considers abusive legal threats, works to expose government malfeasance, provides guidance to the government and courts, organizes political action and mass mailings, supports some new technologies which it believes preserve personal freedoms and online civil liberties, maintains a database and web sites of related news and information, monitors and challenges potential legislation that it believes would infringe on personal liberties and fair use, and solicits a list of what it considers are abusive patents with intentions to defeat those that it considers are without merit.

== History ==
EFF logo used until July 2018

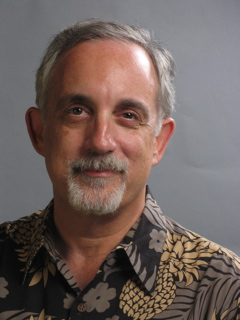
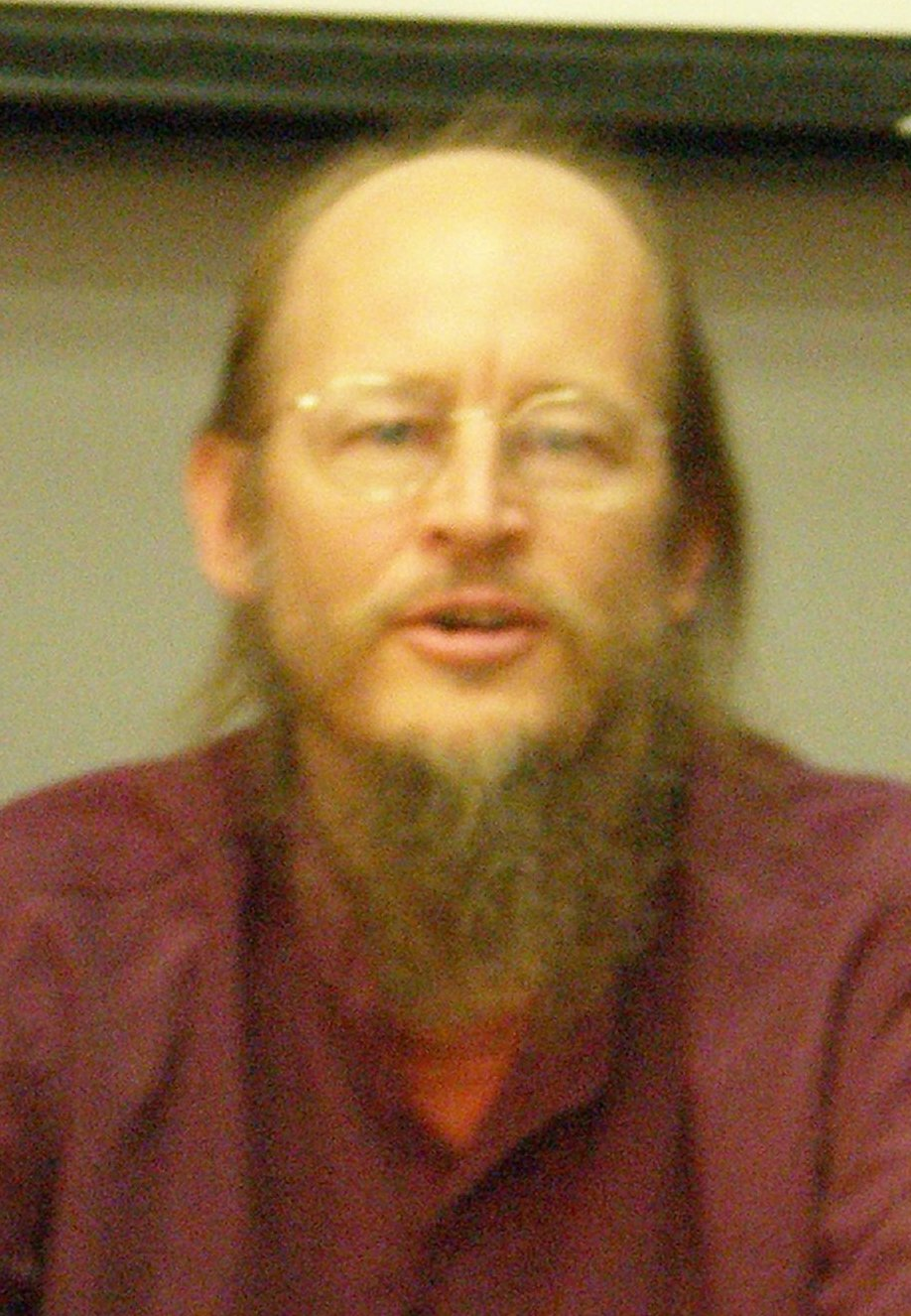
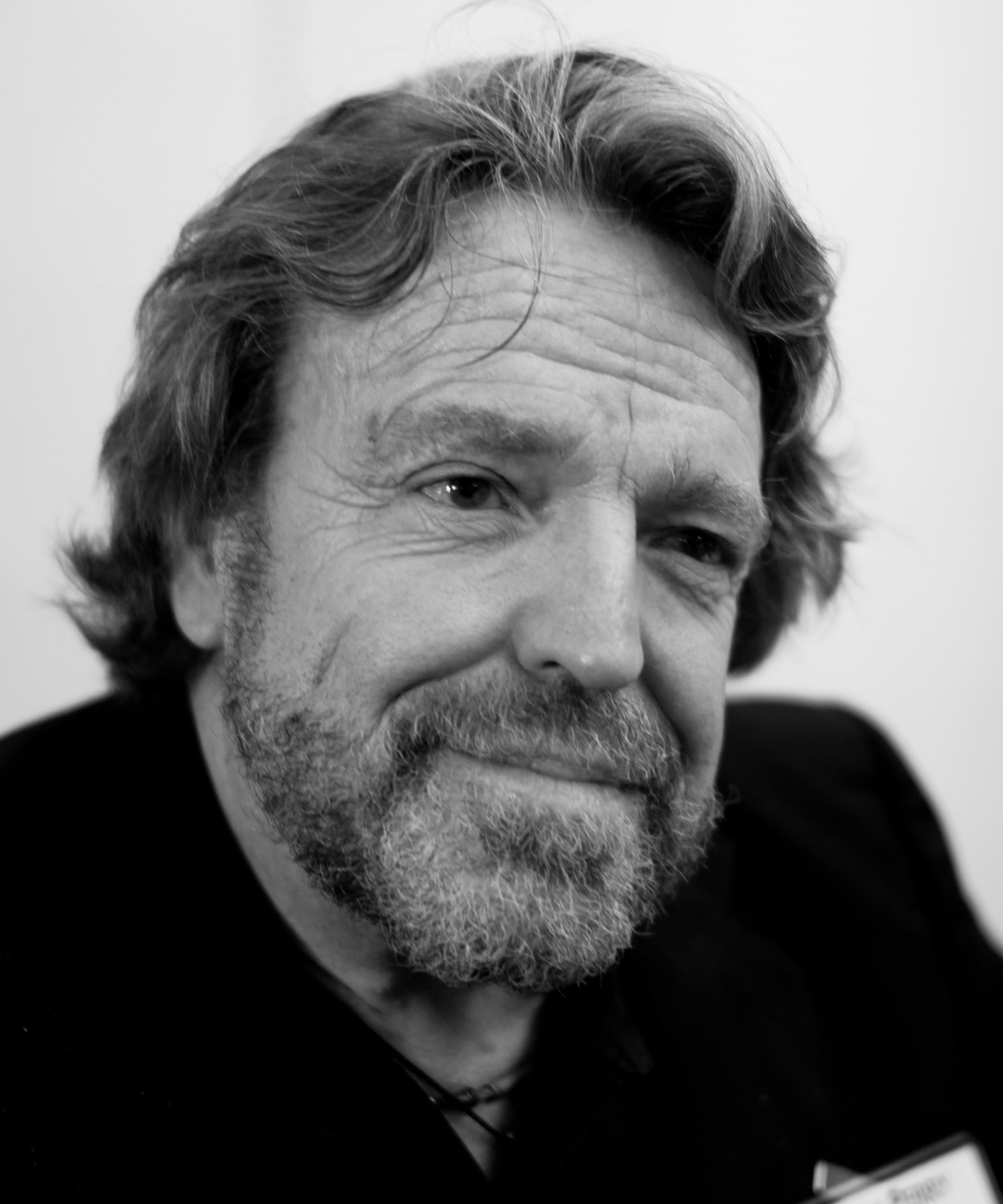
Electronic Frontier Foundation founders Kapor, Gilmore and Barlow

=== Foundation ===
The Electronic Frontier Foundation was formed in 1990 by John Gilmore, John Perry Barlow and Mitch Kapor. The foundation was a response to concerns that law enforcement and policymakers lacked sufficient knowledge about the internet to make decisions or policies that respected people's rights. The EFF was established to lobby for digital rights.

Amid Operation Sundevil, an attempt by the Secret Service to combat cybercrime, a Federal Bureau of Investigation agent visited Barlow at his home in April of 1990. After attending a conference hosted by Harper's, a hacker group sent Barlow and other personalities floppy discs containing pirated, proprietary source code for ROM components made by Apple. Although Barlow was unaware of the reason for the FBI visit, Barlow spent time teaching the agent after he indicated that he did not have a good understanding of how computers and the internet worked. Explaining his concern that the agent was investigating a crime the agent didn't understand, Barlow reflected thinking he "would first have to explain to him what guilt might be."

Barlow posted an account of this experience to The WELL online community. Considering the FBI and Secret Service's heavy-handed tactics during several high-profile raids and arrests, Barlow argued that a civil rights organization was self-evident given the context.

After his post, Barlow was contacted by Mitch Kapor, who had experienced something similar. The pair agreed that there was a need to defend civil liberties on the Internet. Kapor agreed to fund any legal fees associated with such a defense and the pair contacted New York lawyers Rabinowitz, Boudin, Standard, Krinsky and Lieberman about defending others who had attended the event.

John Gilmore and Steve Wozniak provided additional support for the organization around the time it launched in 1990.

=== Expansion and development ===
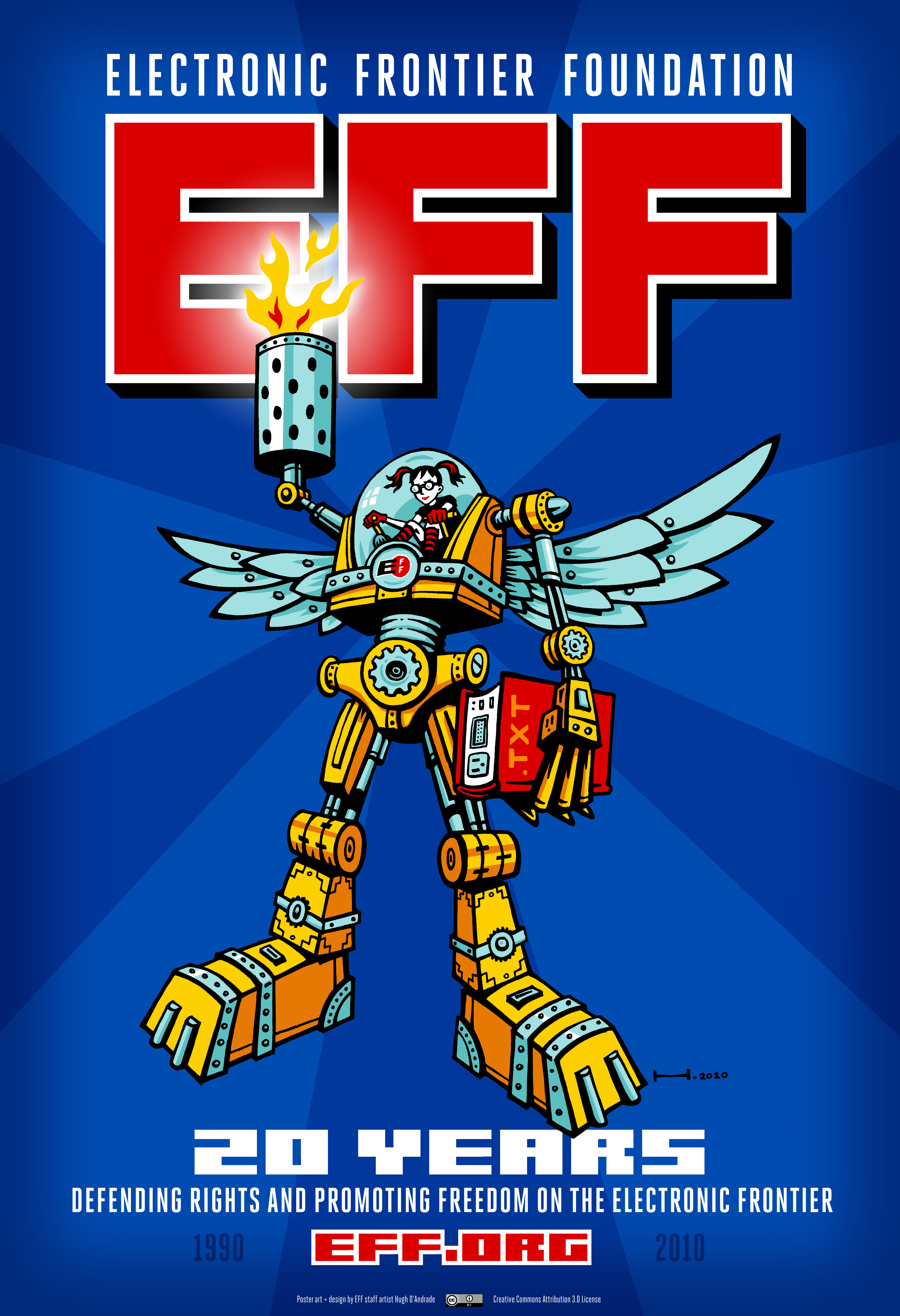
In early 2010, EFF released this poster in celebration of its founding 20 years before.

The organization was originally located at Mitch Kapor's Kapor Enterprises offices in Boston. By the fall of 1993, the main EFF offices were consolidated into a single office in Washington DC, headed by Executive Director Jerry Berman. During this time, some of the EFF's attention focused on influencing national policy, to the dislike of some of the members of the organization. In 1994, Berman parted ways with the EFF and formed the Center for Democracy and Technology.

In 1995, under the auspices of Executive Director Lori Fena, after some downsizing and in an effort to regroup and refocus on their base of support, the organization moved offices to San Francisco, California.

In the spring of 2006, the EFF announced the opening of an office again in Washington, D.C., with two new staff attorneys. In 2012, the EFF decided to move its headquarters from the Mission District to Eddy Street in San Francisco. On March 26, 2026, Nicole Ozer was named the Executive Director, succeeding Cindy Cohn, effective June 1, 2026.

=== DES cracker ===
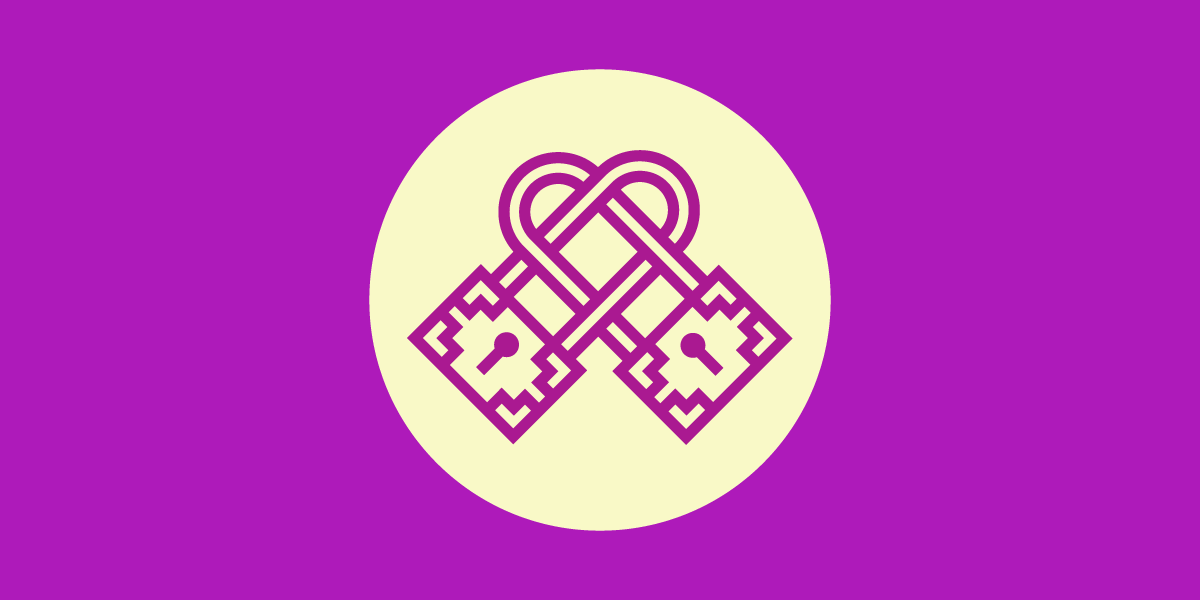

By the mid-1990s the EFF was becoming seriously concerned about the refusal of the US government to license any secure encryption product for export unless it used key recovery and claims that governments could not decrypt information when protected by Data Encryption Standard (DES). The code was first publicly broken in the first of the DES Challenges. EFF coordinated and supported the construction of the EFF DES cracker (nicknamed Deep Crack), using special purpose hardware and software and costing $250,000. This brought the record for breaking a message down to 56 hours on 17 July 1998, which led to government agencies discouraging using DES internally. The next year on 19 January 1999 in conjunction with distributed.net it found the cipher in under 24 hours.

Within four years the Advanced Encryption Standard was standardized as a replacement for DES.

== Activities ==
=== Legislative activity ===
The EFF is a supporter of the Email Privacy Act.

=== Litigation ===
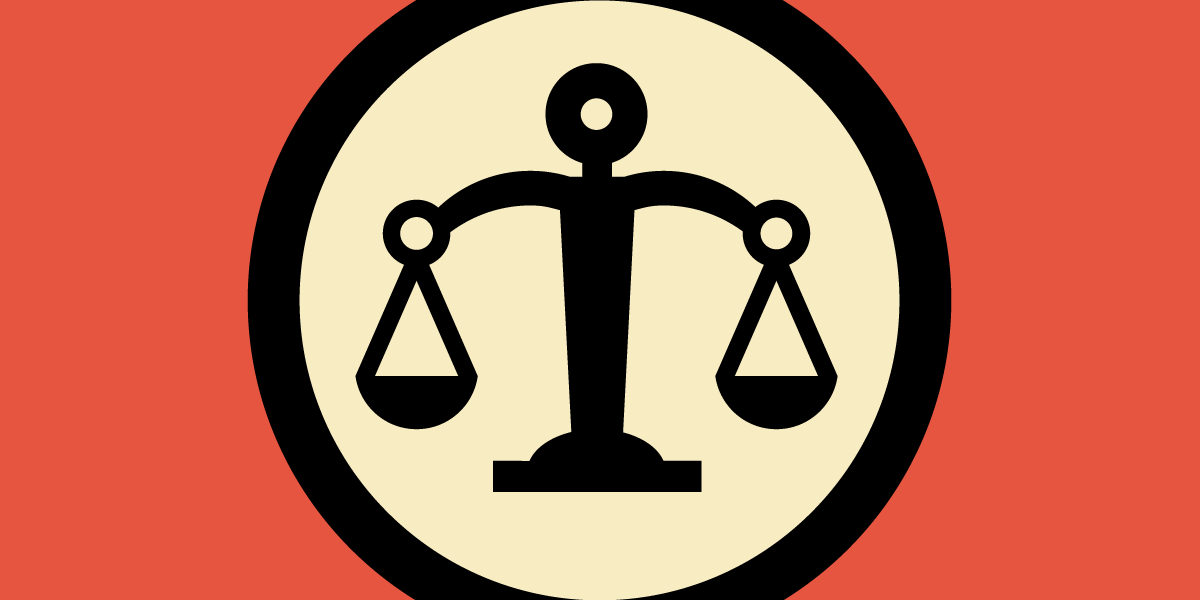

The EFF regularly brings and defends a wide range of lawsuits in the US legal system in pursuit of causes like freer and safer communication online. It has filed a lawsuit to invalidate the Digital Millennium Copyright Act and has long taken a stance against strategic lawsuits against public participation (SLAPP) as attempts to stymie free speech and advocated for effective anti-SLAPP legislation. Many of the most significant technology law cases have involved the EFF, including MGM Studios, Inc. v. Grokster, Ltd., Apple v. Does, and others.

==== Hachette v. Internet Archive ====
The EFF represented the Internet Archive in Hachette v. Internet Archive. Following the COVID-19 pandemic, the Internet Archive introduced a digital book borrowing system which allows users to borrow digital copies of physical books the archive had in its physical location. The case was won by Hachette and the Internet Archive being forced to stop its digital book borrowing system.

=== Patent Busting Project ===
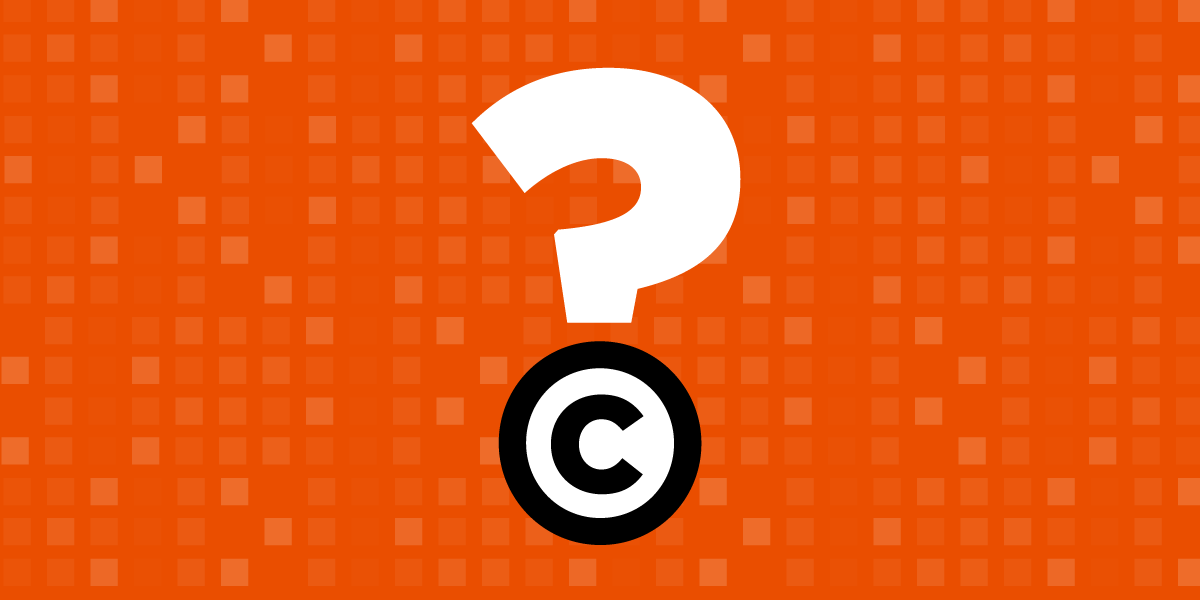

The Patent Busting Project is an Electronic Frontier Foundation (EFF) initiative challenging patents that the organization describes as illegitimate and suppress innovation or limit online expression. The initiative launched on April 19, 2004, and involves two phases: documenting the damage caused by these patents, and submitting challenges to the United States Patent and Trademark Office.

=== Enfranchisement activism ===
The EFF has long been an advocate of paper audit trails for voting machines and testified in support of them after the 2004 United States presidential election. Later, it funded the research of Hariprasad Vemuru who exposed vulnerabilities in a particular model. Since 2008, the EFF has operated the Our Vote Live website and database. Staffed by hotline volunteers, it is designed to quickly document irregularities and instances of voter suppression as they occur on an election day.

=== Content moderation reform ===
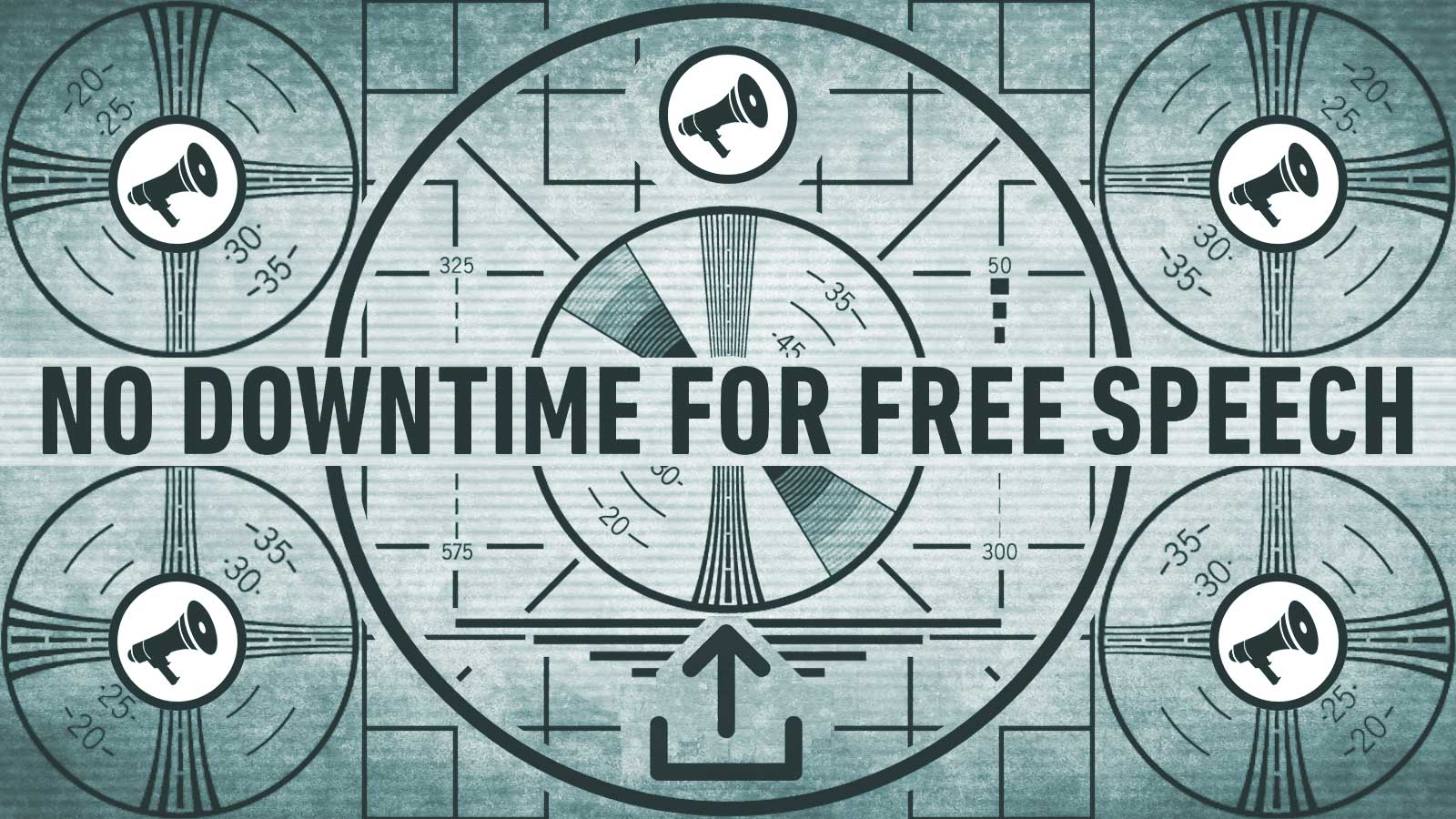

In the spring of 2018, the EFF joined the Open Technology Institute (OTI), the Center for Democracy & Technology, the ACLU Foundation of Northern California and four academics in writing The Santa Clara Principles: On Transparency and Accountability in Content Moderation. The document sets out the following guidelines for social networks.

- Statistics on removed posts should be publicly available.
- Banned users or users who have had posts deleted should be notified with clear reasons.
- Such users should have the opportunity to appeal and have that appeal read by a human.

Six months later, the same organizations sought the support of roughly 80 others, including Article 19, in calling for Facebook to adopt the Santa Clara Principles. This was later updated with a request for Facebook to warn users who have interacted with sock puppet law enforcement accounts.

In 2019, the EFF and OTI delivered testimony about the Online Harms White Paper in the United Kingdom. They commented that several proposals to increase the amount of regulation on social media were open to abuse. Also in 2019, the EFF launched the website "TOSsed out" to document cases of moderation rules being applied inconsistently. Cindy Cohn underscored their commitment to upholding free speech online, writing that "once you've turned it on, whether through pressure or threats of lawsuits, the power to silence people doesn't just go in one direction."

== Awards ==
The EFF organizes two sets of awards to promote work in accordance with its goals and objectives.

=== EFF Awards ===
The EFF Awards, until 2022 called the EFF Pioneer Awards, are awarded annually to recognize individuals who in its opinion are "leaders who are extending freedom and innovation on the electronic frontier."

=== EFF Cooperative Computing Awards ===
The EFF Cooperative Computing Awards are a series of four awards meant "to encourage ordinary Internet users to contribute to solving huge scientific problems", to be awarded to the first individual or group who discovers a prime number with a significant record number of decimal digits. The awards are funded by an anonymous donor. The awards are:

- $50,000 to the first individual or group who discovers a prime number with at least 1,000,000 decimal digits – Awarded April 6, 2000
- $100,000 to the first individual or group who discovers a prime number with at least 10,000,000 decimal digits – Awarded October 14, 2009
- $150,000 to the first individual or group who discovers a prime number with at least 100,000,000 decimal digits
- $250,000 to the first individual or group who discovers a prime number with at least 1,000,000,000 decimal digits.

== Publications ==
EFF's first book was published in 1993 as The Big Dummy's Guide to the Internet, a beginners' how-to manual by contracted technical writer Adam Gaffin, and made available for free download in many formats. MIT Press published it in paperback form in 1994 as Everybody's Guide to the Internet (ISBN 9780262571050).

The organization's second book, Protecting Yourself Online (ISBN 9780062515124), an overview of digital civil liberties, was written in 1998 by technical writer Robert B. Gelman and EFF Communications Director Stanton McCandlish, and published by HarperCollins.

A third book, Cracking DES: Secrets of Encryption Research, Wiretap Politics & Chip Design (ISBN 9781565925205), focusing on EFF's DES Cracker project, was published the same year by O'Reilly Media.

A digital book, Pwning Tomorrow, an anthology of speculative fiction, was produced in 2015 as part of EFF's 25th anniversary activities, and includes contributions from 22 writers, including Charlie Jane Anders, Paolo Bacigalupi, Lauren Beukes, David Brin, Pat Cadigan, Cory Doctorow, Neil Gaiman, Eileen Gunn, Kameron Hurley, James Patrick Kelly, Ramez Naam, Annalee Newitz, Hannu Rajaniemi, Rudy Rucker, Lewis Shiner, Bruce Sterling, and Charles Yu.

=== How to Fix the Internet (podcast) ===
EFF's How to Fix the Internet podcast, hosted by Cindy Cohn, won a 2024 Anthem Award.

== Software ==
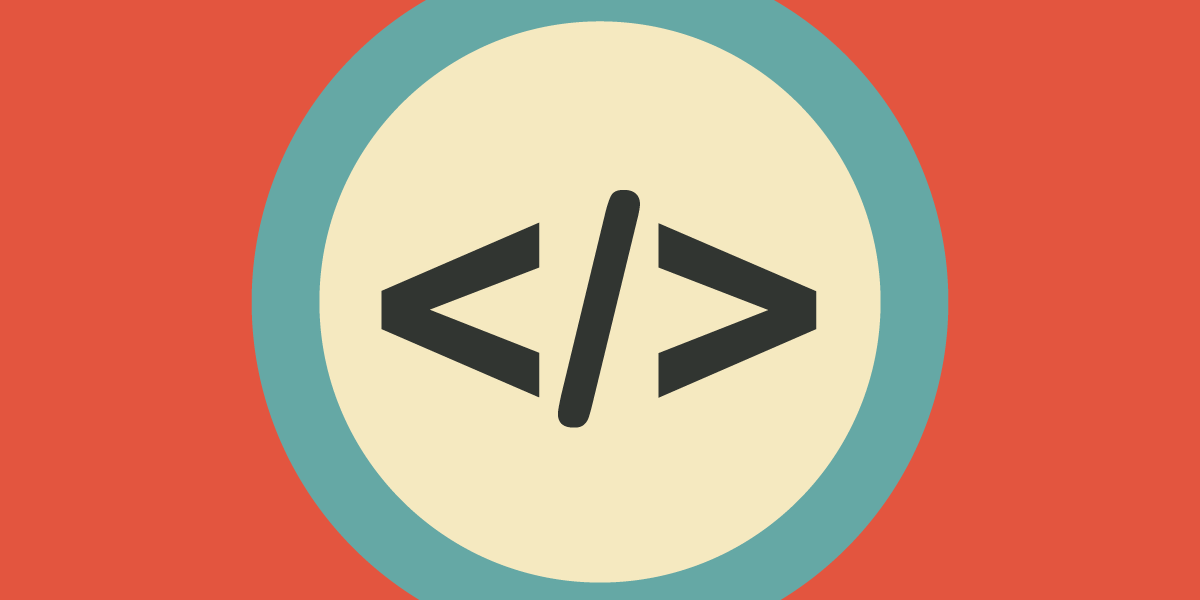

The EFF has developed some software and browser add-ons, including HTTPS Everywhere and Privacy Badger.

In 2014, EFF released its Secure Messaging Scorecard which "evaluated apps and tools based on a set of seven specific criteria ranging from whether messages were encrypted in transit to whether or not the code had been recently audited."

== Support ==
As of September 2025, Charity Navigator has given the EFF an overall rating of 100% as a four-star (out of four) charity.

=== Financial ===
In 2011, the EFF received $1 million from Google as part of a settlement of a class action related to privacy issues involving Google Buzz. The Electronic Privacy Information Center and seven other privacy-focused nonprofits protested that the plaintiffs' lawyers and Google had, in effect, arranged to give the majority of those funds "to organizations that are currently paid by Google to lobby for or to consult for the company". An additional $1 million was obtained from Facebook in a similar settlement.

=== Other ===
In 2011, the agitprop art group Psychological Industries produced buttons to fundraise for the EFF. The buttons featured pop culture tropes including the Laughing Man from the anime series Ghost in the Shell with the original The Catcher in the Rye quote replaced with the slogan of Anonymous, a bleeding roller derby jammer, and the character depicted in the We Can Do It!, World War II-era poster.

In late June 2014, representatives of the EFF and Greenpeace flew a blimp over the National Security Agency's Utah Data Center to protest against reported mass surveillance activities conducted by the United States federal government.

== See also ==
- Anna's Archive
- Center for Democracy and Technology
- Citizen Lab (U of Toronto)
- Clipper chip
- Code as speech
- Digital rights
- European Digital Rights (EDRi)
- Electronic Frontier Canada
- Electronic Frontiers Australia
- Free Software Foundation
- Freedom of the Press Foundation
- Information freedom
- Internet censorship
- League for Programming Freedom
- OpenMedia.ca
- Open Rights Group (UK-based)
- Protection of Broadcasts and Broadcasting Organizations Treaty
- Reporters Without Borders
