= United States trade law =

United States trade law is a sub-discipline of international trade law. Its focus is on the U.S. Government's (USG) various agencies' administrative rules, regulations and policies that govern the movement of goods and services into and out of the United States and the movement of licensed U.S. goods throughout the world. Adherence to the regulations is generically referred to as "international trade compliance."

== Agencies and laws ==
- Bureau of Industry and Security (U.S. Department of Commerce) – Export Administration Regulations (CFR-38)
- Directorate of Defense Trade Controls (U.S. State Department) – International Traffic in Arms Regulations
- Arms Export Control Act
- U.S. Arms Control Act
- U.S. Customs and Border Protection (U.S. Department of Homeland Security)
- Office of Foreign Asset Control(U.S. Treasury Department)
- Foreign Corrupt Practices Act
- ATF & E (U.S. Department of Justice)

== Acts of Congress that impact trade and U.S. Treaties impacting trade ==
- NAFTA
- Incoterms
- Foreign Compliance Regimens: Wassenaar Arrangement

== History ==
This sub-discipline gained prominence shortly after the terrorist attacks on the U.S. on September 11, 2001, when USG agencies stepped up their effort to protect America's borders and trade from terrorist's attacks and to protect the nation's national security interest. More than 20 USG agencies' rules, regulations, and doctrines fall within the discipline.

== Objectives ==
Unlike the broader discipline of international trade law, which is concerned with commerce between nations, this discipline's focus is on the sovereign nation regulations impacting the actual movement of goods across the nation's borders.

== See also ==
- Foreign trade of the United States
- Tariffs in the second Trump administration
- United States admiralty law
- United States energy law
