= United States government sanctions =

Trade restrictions levied by the United States government

Jurisdictions specifically sanctioned by the United States under an OFAC sanctions program or State Department arms-related export controls. Comprehensively sanctioned jurisdiction Targeted sanctions (individuals and entities threatening the peace, stability, and sovereignty, and/or contributing to conflict) Arms embargo Targeted sanctions and arms embargo United States

United States government sanctions are financial and trade restrictions imposed against individuals, entities, and jurisdictions whose actions contradict U.S. foreign policy or national security goals. Financial sanctions are primarily administered by the U.S. Department of the Treasury's Office of Foreign Assets Control (OFAC), while export controls are primarily administered by the U.S. Department of Commerce's Bureau of Industry and Security (BIS).

Restrictions against sanctioned targets vary in severity. Comprehensive sanctions currently target Cuba, Iran, North Korea, Russia, and certain conflict regions of Ukraine, heavily restricting nearly all trade and financial transactions between U.S. persons and those regions. Targeted sanctions focus on specific individuals or entities engaged in activities contrary to U.S. foreign policy or national security goals. The U.S. also implements "secondary sanctions," which risk a sanctions designation against a non-U.S. person who transacts with sanctioned parties in violation of U.S. sanctions law, even where no U.S.-jurisdictional nexus existed.

Critics of the United States sanctions program raise humanitarian concerns related to adverse impacts felt by populations whose governments or economies have been sanctioned, as well as cases where sanctions were not effective in deterring adversarial activities.

== History ==
After the failure of the Embargo Act of 1807, the federal government of the United States took little interest in imposing embargoes and economic sanctions against foreign countries until the 20th century. United States trade policy was entirely a matter of economic policy. After World War I, interest revived. President Woodrow Wilson promoted such sanctions as a method for the League of Nations to enforce peace. However, he failed to bring the United States into the League, and the U.S. did not join the 1935 League sanctions against Italy.

According to communications studies academic Stuart H. Davis and political scientist Immanuel Ness, trends in whether the United States has unilaterally or multilaterally imposed sanctions have changed over time. During the Cold War, the United States led unilateral sanctions against Cuba, China, and North Korea. Following the disintegration of the Soviet Union and the end of the Cold War, United States sanctions became increasingly multilateral. During the 1990s, the United States imposed sanctions against countries it viewed as rogue states—such as Zimbabwe, Yugoslavia, and Iraq—in conjunction with multilateral institutions such as the United Nations or the World Trade Organization. Davis and Ness state that in the 2000s, and with increasing frequency in the 2010s, the United States acted less multilaterally as it imposed sanctions against perceived geopolitical competitors such as Russia and China, or countries that were the site of "proxy conflicts" such as Yemen and Syria.

During the COVID-19 pandemic, Michelle Bachelet, the United Nations High Commissioner for Human Rights, and some members of the United States Congress asked the United States to suspend its sanctions regimes as a way to help alleviate the pandemic's impact on people in sanctioned countries. Members of Congress who argued for suspension included Bernie Sanders, Alexandria Ocasio-Cortez, and Ilhan Omar.

According to a 2024 analysis by The Washington Post, 60% of low-income countries were under some form of U.S. financial sanction, and the U.S. imposes three times as many sanctions as any other country or international body.

== Legal framework ==
=== Authorizing laws ===
Several laws delegate embargo power to the President:

- Trading with the Enemy Act of 1917
- Foreign Assistance Act of 1961
- International Emergency Economic Powers Act of 1977
- Export Administration Act of 1979

Several laws specifically prohibit trade with certain countries:

- Cuban Assets Control Regulations of 1963
- Cuban Democracy Act of 1992
- Helms–Burton Act of 1996 (Cuba)
- Iran and Libya Sanctions Act of 1996
- Trade Sanction Reform and Export Enhancement Act of 2000 (Cuba)
- Iran Freedom and Support Act of 2006
- Comprehensive Iran Sanctions, Accountability, and Divestment Act of 2010

=== Implementing agencies ===
- Bureau of Industry and Security
- Directorate of Defense Trade Controls
- Office of Foreign Assets Control
- U.S. Customs and Border Protection
- United States Department of Commerce (Export Administration Regulations, EAR)
- United States Department of Defense
- United States Department of Energy (nuclear technology)
- United States Department of Homeland Security (border crossings)
- United States Department of Justice (including ATF and FBI)
- United States Department of State (International Traffic in Arms Regulations, ITAR)
- United States Department of the Treasury

== Types of sanctions ==
Types of restrictions the United States may impose through sanctions include:

- bans on arms-related exports,
- controls over dual-use technology exports,
- restrictions on economic assistance,
- financial restrictions such as:
  - authority to prohibit U.S. citizens from engaging in financial transactions with listed individuals, entities, or governments, except by license from the U.S. government,
  - requiring the United States to oppose loans by the World Bank and other international financial institutions,
  - diplomatic immunity waived, to allow families of terrorism victims to file for civil damages in U.S. courts,
  - tax credits for companies and individuals denied for income earned in listed countries,
  - duty-free goods exemption suspended for imports from those countries, and
  - prohibition of U.S. Defense Department contracts above $100,000 with companies controlled by listed countries,
- visa restrictions preventing certain individuals from entering the U.S.

== Targeted parties ==
The U.S. does not maintain a single list of countries U.S. persons cannot do business with, as its sanctions program varies in scope. Although some sanctions programs are broad and target entire jurisdictions ("comprehensively sanctioned jurisdictions"), most are "targeted" sanctions focused on specific entities, individuals, or economic sectors. Depending on the nature of the restriction, U.S. sanctions are announced and implemented by different executive departments, typically the Treasury Department (OFAC) or the Commerce Department (BIS), and sometimes in conjunction with the State, Defense, or Energy departments.

=== Comprehensively sanctioned jurisdictions ===
Comprehensively sanctioned jurisdictions are subject to the most restrictive sanctions measures. Most transactions between a U.S. person and any person or entity "ordinarily resident" in a comprehensively sanctioned jurisdiction are restricted. In addition to the general sanctions listed below, transactions involving entities or individuals from these countries on OFAC's SDN List or BIS' Entity List are also restricted.

Jurisdiction/Region	Summary of certain restrictions
Cuba	Treasury: Prohibition from doing business or investing in Cuba without a license; Commerce: License required for the export or reexport of all items on the Export Administration Regulations except food, medicine, medical devices, items necessary to ensure safe civil aviation, items necessary for environmental protection, items to improve telecommunication services, and items destined to the Cuban government to benefit the Cuban people; State: Designation as State Sponsors of Terrorism; See also: United States embargo against Cuba
Iran	Treasury: Prohibition on the importation, exportation, and reexportation of goods, services, and technology from/to Iran; Prohibition on transactions with the Islamic Revolutionary Guard Corps and their financial facilitators, such as the National Iranian Oil Company and National Iranian Tanker Company; Commerce: License required for the export or reexport of most items on the Export Administration Regulations; State: Designation as State Sponsors of Terrorism; See also: United States sanctions against Iran
North Korea	Treasury: Financial block on the government of North Korea and the Workers' Party of Korea; Prohibition on the importation, exportation and reexportation of goods, services (including financial services), and technology from/to North Korea; Prohibition on new investments in North Korea; Implementation of United Nations Security Council Resolution 2270; Commerce: License required for the export or reexport of all items on the Export Administration Regulations except food or medicine; State: General prohibition on travel to North Korea; Designation as State Sponsors of Terrorism; See also: U.S. sanctions against North Korea
Russia	Treasury: Financial block on certain elements and officials of the Russian government including the Central Bank of Russia, Ministry of Finance, and Vladimir Putin, as well as Russian financial institutions; Prohibitions on the import to and export from Russia of certain items; Prohibitions on new investment in certain sectors of the Russian economy; Commerce: License required for the export or reexport of all items on the Export Administration Regulations; License required for the export or reexport of certain foreign-produced items made with U.S. inputs
Ukraine (Donetsk, Luhansk, and Crimea only)	Treasury: Prohibition on new investment in Donetsk, Luhansk, or Crimea; Prohibition on the importation and exportation of any goods, services, or technology to/from Donetsk, Luhansk, or Crimea; Commerce: License required for the export or reexport of all items on the Export Administration Regulations except food, medicine, or software necessary to enable the exchange of personal communications over the Internet
Belarus	Treasury: Prohibition on transactions with major Belarusian state-owned enterprises, financial institutions, and designated officials; Restrictions on providing certain services, including financial, accounting, trust, and corporate formation services; Commerce: License required for the export or reexport of nearly all items on the Export Administration Regulations due to Russia‑aligned export controls; License required for certain foreign-produced items incorporating U.S. technology; Note: Belarus is not formally designated by OFAC as a "comprehensively sanctioned jurisdiction," but U.S. restrictions are extensive and closely aligned with those applied to Russia.

=== Targeted sanctions ===
In jurisdictions not subject to comprehensive sanctions, only transactions related to specific parties are prohibited. Jurisdictions that face targeted sanctions may continue to do business with the United States, with restrictions only placed on specific categories of individuals or entities, and anyone worldwide who materially supports or provides financial, logistical, or technological support for them.

According to OFAC, there are approximately 12,000 names on the Specially Designated Nationals and Blocked Persons List (SDN list), which is the most restrictive category of targeted U.S. sanctions, targeting U.S.-designated terrorists, officials and beneficiaries of certain authoritarian regimes, and international criminals such as drug traffickers by blocking their U.S. assets and restricting U.S. persons from engaging in any transactions with them.

The following jurisdictions have a specific OFAC sanctions program for SDN designations targeting individuals or entities engaging in sanctionable activities:

Jurisdiction/Region	Summary of certain restrictions
Belarus	Persons the US government believes to be undermining Belarus' democratic processes or institutions, committing political repression activities, and/or misusing public assets and public authority.
Central African Republic	Persons the US government believes is responsible, complicit, or have engaged in actions that threaten peace, security, or stability of the Central African Republic, including actions that undermine democratic processes or institutions, threaten the political transition process, target civilians, or UN and other peacekeeping operations through the commission of acts of violence, use of children in armed groups, or obstruct the delivery of humanitarian assistance.
Democratic Republic of the Congo	Persons the US government believes is a political or military leader of an armed group operating in the DRC that impedes the peace, security, or stability of the DRC, including actions that undermine democratic processes or institutions, threaten the political transition process, target civilians, or UN and other peacekeeping operations through the commission of acts of violence, use of children in armed groups, or obstruct the delivery of humanitarian assistance.
Ethiopia	Persons the US government believes is responsible for or complicit in actions that threaten the peace, security, or stability of Ethiopia, including expanding the crisis in northern Ethiopia or obstructing the peace process, or engaging in actions that undermine democratic processes or institutions, including corruption or serious human rights abuses, to obstruct the delivery of humanitarian assistance, target civilians through violence, or committing attacks against UN or African Union personnel. Entities the US government believes is a military or security force operating in northern Ethiopia after November 1, 2020, or has engaged in activities that have contributed to the crisis in northern Ethiopia.
Hong Kong	Persons the US government believes is responsible for developing, adopting, or implementing the Hong Kong national security law, or be responsible or complicit in actions or policies that undermine democratic processes or institutions in Hong Kong, or threaten the peace, security, stability, or autonomy of Hong Kong, including censorship, extrajudicial rendition, arbitrary detention, or torture of any person in Hong Kong. See also: Executive Order 13936
International Criminal Court	In February 2025, the second Donald Trump administration issued Executive Order 14203 sanctioning ICC personnel with asset freezes and travel bans. The Executive Order followed the failure to pass sanctions in the US Senate against the ICC for its Benjamin Netanyahu arrest warrant.
Iraq	Persons the US government believes has committed acts of violence that threaten the peace or stability of Iraq or the government of Iraq, undermine efforts to promote economic reconstruction and political reform in Iraq, or obstruct the provision of humanitarian assistance.
Lebanon	Persons the US government believes has taken action to undermine Lebanon's democratic processes or institutions, contributed to the breakdown of the rule of law in Lebanon, support the assertion of Syrian control or influence in Lebanon, or infringing or undermining Lebanese sovereignty.
Libya	Persons the US government believes is responsible for actions that threaten the peace, security, or stability of Libya, obstruct, undermine, delay, or impede the political transition process, misappropriate state assets, or threaten state financial institutions, or planning, directing, or committing attacks on Libyan state facilities or civilian facilities, or illegally exploit and export Libyan natural resources.
Mali	Persons contributing to the Conflict in Mali including Government officials tied to Wagner Group such as Malian Defense Minister Colonel Sadio Camara, Air Force Chief of Staff Colonel Alou Boi Diarra, and Deputy Chief of Staff Lieutenant Colonel Adama Bagayoko.
Myanmar	Persons the US government believes operates in the defense or other critical sectors of the Burmese economy, or are responsible for actions or policies that undermine democratic processes or institutions or threaten the peace, security, or stability of Myanmar, or limit the exercise of freedom of expression or assembly, or arbitrary detention or torture, or is a leader of the military or security forces of Myanmar, or the government of Myanmar after February 2, 2021.
Nicaragua	Persons the US government believes is responsible for serious human rights abuses, actions that undermine democratic processes or institutions or threaten the peace, security, or stability of Nicaragua, or engaged in corrupt transactions related to the misappropriation of public assets.
Somalia	Persons the US government believes has engaged in acts that threaten the peace, security, or stability of Somalia including threatening the peace process, misappropriating public assets, or engaging in acts of piracy, or obstructed the delivery of humanitarian assistance, engaged in acts of violence targeting civilians, recruited children in armed conflict, or imported or exported charcoal from Somalia.
South Sudan	Persons the US government believes has engaged in acts that threaten the peace, security, or stability of South Sudan, including actions that threaten the peace process, expanding the conflict in South Sudan, committing human rights abuses and violence against civilians, or attacks against UN or other international peacekeeping operations.
Sudan	Persons the US government believes has engaged in acts that threaten the peace, security, or stability of Sudan, including undermining the peace process and the democratic process or institutions of Sudan, or engage in censorship, corruption, misappropriation of state assets, serious human rights abuses, acts of violence against civilians, or obstruction of or attacks against UN peacekeeping missions.
Syria	Persons the US government believes has engaged in acts that threaten the peace, security, or stability or territorial integrity of Syria, including committing human rights abuses, engaging in the illicit production and proliferation of captagon, or having materially assisted, sponsored, or provided financial, material, or technological support for the former regime of Bashar al-Assad.
Venezuela	The Government of Venezuela, those operating in the Venezuelan gold sector, or persons the US government believes is engaging in corrupt government programs, engaged in actions that undermine democratic processes or institutions, commit significant acts of violence, or restrict the freedom of expression or peaceful assembly. See also: United States sanctions during the Venezuelan crisis
Western Balkans	Persons under open indictment by the International Criminal Tribunal for the former Yugoslavia, or has committed actions that threaten the peace, security, stability, or territorial integrity of any area in the Western Balkans, including actions that undermine the democratic processes or institutions in the Western Balkans, obstructed the peace process, engaged in serious human rights abuses, or are responsible for the misappropriation of public assets for personal gain.
Yemen	Persons the US government believes has engaged in acts that threaten the peace, security, or stability of Yemen, including obstructing the peaceful transition of power or the political process.
Zimbabwe	Persons the US government believes has engaged in actions to undermine Zimbabwe's democratic processes or institutions, engaged in human rights abuses or public corruption, as well as senior officials of the Government of Zimbabwe, or is a state-owned institution.

==== Human rights abuses and corruption ====
Building off the Global Magnitsky Human Rights Accountability Act, named after Sergei Magnitsky who died in Russian custody after uncovering corruption, the U.S. can enact sanctions against any individual or entity worldwide who it says engages in severe human rights abuses and corruption that degrade the rule of law, perpetuate violent conflicts, and facilitate the activities of dangerous persons. The following jurisdictions are frequently targeted by U.S. sanctions related to human rights abuses but are not specifically targeted under a country-specific sanctions program:

Jurisdiction/Region	Summary of targeted individuals/entities
Afghanistan	Persons associated with the Taliban involved in the suppression of women's and girl's access to education, and the beating of protestors and unlawful detention of journalists. Former Afghani officials and their companies engaged in corrupt activities and siphoning resources from the former Afghani Armed Forces.
Cambodia	Targeting government officials engaged in corruption.
China	Chinese government officials whom the US government believes are committing human rights abuses against the Uyghurs in Xinjiang and human rights abuses in Hong Kong. See also: United States sanctions against China
Eritrea	Certain persons the US government believes are involved in the Ethiopian war, such as armed forces and government officials.
Georgia	Persons the US government believes undermine Georgia's democratic processes and institutions.
Lebanon	Persons the US government believes undermine the sovereignty of Lebanon or its democratic processes and institutions.
Mali	Officials contributing to the Conflict in Mali including Government officials tied to Wagner Group such as Malian Defense Minister Colonel Sadio Camara, Air Force Chief of Staff Colonel Alou Boi Diarra, and Deputy Chief of Staff Lieutenant Colonel Adama Bagayoko.
Myanmar	Officials associated with ethnic cleansing related to the ongoing Rohingya crisis and those associated with ethnic militias including the United Wa State Army.
North Korea	Targeting government officials associated with state-sponsored human rights abuses and censorship.
Nicaragua	Persons associated with contributing to the repression of the 2018–2020 Nicaraguan protests.
Russia	Persons associated with abuses against human rights activists and whistleblowers such as Sergei Magnitsky.
South Sudan	Persons the US government alleges have contributed to the conflict in South Sudan or committed human rights abuses.
Zimbabwe	Persons the US government believes undermine democratic processes or institutions in Zimbabwe.

==== Terrorism ====
Some jurisdictions whose resident individuals or entities are frequently targeted for sanctions under counter-terrorism authorities include:

Jurisdiction/Region	Summary of targeted individuals/entities
Gaza	Targeting persons and organizations tied to Hamas-affiliated groups.
Lebanon	Targeting Hezbollah-linked facilitators and financiers.
Iran	Targeting Iranian support for terrorist organizations including Hamas, Hezbollah, and Houthis.
Yemen	Persons who the US government claims threaten peace, security, or stability in Yemen.

==== Drug trafficking and transnational criminal organizations ====
Some jurisdictions whose resident individuals or entities are frequently targeted for sanctions under anti-drug trafficking or transnational criminal organizations-related authorities include:

Jurisdiction/Region	Summary of targeted individuals/entities
Italy	Targeting the organizational structure and prominent leaders of the Camorra.
Japan	Targeting the organizational structure and prominent members of the Yakuza, such as the Yamaguchi-gumi and Inagawa-kai.
Laos	Targeting the organizational structure and prominent members of Zhao Wei's criminal enterprise engaging in drug trafficking, human trafficking, money laundering, bribery, and wildlife trafficking, much of which is facilitated through the Kings Romans Casino in Laos.
Mexico	Targeting the organizational structure and prominent members of drug cartels, including the Sinaloa Cartel, Los Zetas, and Beltrán-Leyva Organization, as well as human smuggling rings.
Russia	Targeting the organizational structure and prominent members of the Brothers' Circle.
Brazil	Targeting the organizational structure and prominent leaders of the Primeiro Comando da Capital.

=== Jurisdictions subject to arms-related export controls ===
==== Department of State Arms Embargo ====
The U.S. government maintains a policy of denial for any exports of defense articles or defense services to the following countries:

- Afghanistan
- Belarus
- Cambodia
- Central African Republic
- China (Note: Certain Chinese defense companies are also subject to Treasury Department restrictions on U.S. outbound investments.)
- Democratic Republic of the Congo
- Cuba
- Cyprus
- Eritrea
- Haiti
- Iran
- Iraq
- Lebanon
- Libya
- Myanmar
- Nicaragua
- North Korea
- Russia
- Somalia
- South Sudan
- Sudan
- Venezuela
- Zimbabwe

Formerly

- Ethiopia
- Syria

==== Department of Commerce Military End Use/User Rule ====
The U.S. government also enforces stricter restrictions on a more expansive definition of defense items, including the export of any U.S.-origin item that "supports or contributes" to the operation, installation, maintenance, repair, overhaul, refurbishing, development, or production of military items to specified countries. The same countries are also subject to additional license requirements for certain exports to the targeted countries' "military end users," defined as their national armed services, national police, national intelligence services, and anyone whose activities "support or contribute to military end uses."

- Cambodia
- China
- Myanmar
- Nicaragua
- Venezuela

==== Russia/Belarus MEU FDP Rule ====
Russia and Belarus are subject to the same restrictions as the military end use/user rule, with more expansive coverage that includes foreign-produced items made using U.S.-origin software or technology, manufactured by plants or major components that are products of the U.S.

- Belarus
- Russia

=== Former sanctions ===
Entities	Description
Burundi	Persons who the US government claimed threatened peace, security, or stability in Burundi. Sanctions lifted on November 18, 2021.
International Criminal Court	Persons affiliated with the International Criminal Court who the US government claimed infringed on US sovereignty by asserting jurisdiction over US government and allied government personnel. Sanctions lifted in July 2021.
Syria	Treasury: Prohibition on the direct or indirect exportation of services to Syria; Prohibition on the importation of petroleum products from Syria, or dealing in transactions related to Syrian petroleum; Prohibition of new investment in Syria; Commerce: License required for the export or reexport of all items on the Export Administration Regulations except food or medicine; State: Designation as State Sponsors of Terrorism; See also: International sanctions against Syria Sanctions lifted in May 2025.
West Bank	Persons or entities the US government believed had enacted, implemented, or enforced policies that threaten the peace, security, or stability of the West Bank, including violence targeting civilians, property destruction, seizure or dispossession of property, or had or were planning to commit terrorist attacks in the region.

== Effects ==
=== Efficacy ===
The increase in the use of economic leverage as a U.S. foreign policy tool has prompted debate about its usefulness and effectiveness. According to Rawi Abdelal, sanctions have become the dominant tool of statecraft of the U.S. and other Western countries in the post-Cold War era, noting that "sanctions are useful when diplomacy is not sufficient but force is too costly." British diplomat Jeremy Greenstock said sanctions are popular because "there is nothing else [to do] between words and military action if you want to bring pressure upon a government."

Critics of sanctions' effectiveness are widespread. According to Daniel T. Griswold of the Cato Institute, sanctions have failed to change the behavior of sanctioned countries while barring American companies from economic opportunities and harming the poorest people in sanctioned countries. A study by the Peterson Institute for International Economics found that sanctions achieved their goals in fewer than 20% of cases. Stuart Davis states that sanctions almost never lead to the overthrow of sanctioned governments or compliance by those governments, and that the more common outcome is the entrenchment in power of state elites in the sanctioned country. In a study of U.S. sanctions from 1981 to 2000, political scientist Dursun Peksen found sanctions to be counterproductive, failing to improve human rights and instead leading to a further decrease in sanctioned countries' "respect for physical integrity rights, including freedom from disappearances, extrajudicial killings, torture, and political imprisonment." Former CIA Deputy Director David Cohen wrote that the logic of coercive sanctions "does not hold, however, when the objective of sanctions is regime change. Put simply, because the cost of relinquishing power will always exceed the benefit of sanctions relief, a targeted state cannot conceivably accede to a demand for regime change." Political scientist Lisa Martin criticized a game theory view of sanctions, arguing that proponents characterize success so broadly—applying it to outcomes from "renegotiation" to "influencing global public opinion"—that the terminology of "winning" and "losing" overextends those concepts.

==== Efficacy against Russia ====
Academic Jeremy Garlick writes that sanctions against Russia have, at least in the short term, backfired both economically and geopolitically, benefiting Russia's economy and bringing Russia and China closer together. Following the Russian invasion of Ukraine, Asian countries—primarily China and India—absorbed an increasing share of Russian oil and gas. Because Russian imports from the West declined after sanctions, Russia's trade balance rose sharply, increasing cash reserves. By June 2022, the Russian ruble had risen sharply and was among the world's best-performing currencies.

In October 2025, the United States imposed sanctions against Russia's largest oil companies Rosneft and Lukoil, and threatened secondary sanctions against foreign financial institutions and companies continuing to do business with them, with particular implications for customers in China and India.

=== Humanitarian concerns ===
Critics have raised humanitarian concerns about the impact of U.S. sanctions on civilian populations. Daniel T. Griswold, writing from a conservative Christian perspective, argues that sanctions limit a sanctioned country's people from exercising political liberties and market freedom. In 1997, the American Association for World Health stated the US embargo against Cuba contributed to malnutrition, poor water access, and lack of access to medicine and other medical supplies.

The impact of sanctions on mortality has been the subject of several studies. Economist Helen Yaffe estimates U.S. sanctions on Venezuela caused the deaths of 100,000 people between 2014 and 2020 due to difficulty importing medicine and health care equipment. A study by Mark Weisbrot and Jeffrey Sachs estimated sanctions contributed to approximately 40,000 excess deaths in Venezuela between 2017 and 2018, though critics argued the impact of sanctions could not be adequately separated from pre-existing negative trends.

Comprehensive sanctions on Iraq by the United Nations Security Council during the 1990s were linked to widespread malnutrition, shortages of medicine, and deterioration of water and electricity infrastructure. A 1999 UNICEF study estimated between 400,000 and 500,000 excess deaths among children under 5 since 1991; however, surveys conducted after 2003 found no evidence of a large sustained rise in under-5 mortality beginning in 1991. A 2017 study in The BMJ by Tim Dyson and Valeria Cetorelli concluded that "Saddam Hussein's government successfully manipulated the 1999 survey in order to convey a very false impression."

In the case of Cuba, a declassified 1960 U.S. State Department memorandum by diplomat Lester D. Mallory argued that "every possible means should be undertaken promptly to weaken the economic life of Cuba" by denying money and supplies in order "to bring about hunger, desperation and overthrow of government."

A 2025 study funded by the Center for Economic and Policy Research, authored by Mark Weisbrot, Francisco Rodríguez, and Silvio Rendón and published in The Lancet, estimated that unilateral sanctions by all parties—including those of the United States, United Nations, and European Union—were associated with as many as 564,258 deaths annually between 1971 and 2021. The study found "significant causal association between sanctions and increased mortality" with "the strongest effects for unilateral, economic, and US sanctions." Writing in Al Jazeera about this study, Jason Hickel, Dylan Sullivan, and Omer Tayyab estimated that unilateral sanctions imposed by the United States and European Union since 1970 were associated with approximately 38 million deaths worldwide, with more than half of the victims being children and the elderly, and that sanctions kill several times more people each year than die as direct casualties of war.

=== Secondary sanctions ===
Donald Trump during the signing of the Sanctioning Russia Act in the Oval Office, September 18, 2026

Secondary U.S. sanctions prohibit any trading in U.S. dollars and prevent trade with a country, individuals, or organizations under the U.S. sanctions regime, affecting non-U.S. persons even where no U.S.-jurisdictional nexus existed. Primary sanctions, by contrast, restrict only U.S. companies, institutions, and citizens from doing business with sanctioned countries or entities.

According to Rawi Abdelal, secondary sanctions often create friction between the U.S. and Europe because they reflect U.S. interference in the affairs and interests of the European Union (EU), and their increasing use is perceived in the EU as a violation of national and EU sovereignty. Secondary sanctions imposed on Iran and Russia are central to these tensions. Abdelal also argues that the U.S.'s overuse of sanctions risks gradual isolation and the continuing decline of U.S. influence in an emerging multipolar world.

In June 2025, a majority of U.S. senators supported secondary sanctions against Russia that would impose 500% tariffs on countries that buy Russian oil, natural gas, uranium, and other exports. On July 31, 2025, the U.S. announced its first "secondary tariff," targeting India to penalize its trade with Russia, with Indian exports facing an extra 25% tariff beginning August 27, 2025.

=== De-dollarization ===
Business-studies academic Tim Beal views the U.S.'s imposition of financial sanctions as a factor increasing dedollarization efforts, citing responses such as the Russian-developed System for Transfers of Financial Messages (SPFS), the China-supported Cross-Border Interbank Payment System (CIPS), and the European Instrument in Support of Trade Exchanges (INSTEX) that followed the U.S.'s withdrawal from the Joint Comprehensive Plan of Action (JCPOA) with Iran.

Historian Renate Bridenthal wrote that "the most looming blowback to US sanctions policy is the growing set of challenges to dollar hegemony," citing the use of local currencies to trade with sanctioned countries and attempts by Russia and China to increase the gold backing of their respective currencies.

== See also ==
- State Sponsors of Terrorism (U.S. list)
- Specially Designated Nationals and Blocked Persons List
- United States sanctions on Bangladesh
- Caesar Syria Civilian Protection Act
- Rogue state
- Economic sanctions against the United States
- Permanent normal trade relations
- Arms Export Control Act
- Criticism of United States foreign policy
- European Union sanctions
- United Kingdom sanctions
- United States foreign adversaries
