= Foreign Military Sales Act of 1968 =

- Long title: An Act to consolidate and revise foreign assistance legislation relating to reimbursable military exports.
- Acronyms (colloquial): FMSA
- Enacted by: the 90th United States Congress
- Effective: October 22, 1968

Citations
- Public law: 90-629
- Statutes at Large: 82 Stat. 1320

Codification
- Titles amended: 22 U.S.C.: Foreign Relations and Intercourse
- U.S.C. sections amended: 22 U.S.C. ch. 24 § 1934; 22 U.S.C. ch. 32 §§ 2151, 2341–2345, 2382, 2392, 2394, 2399a, 2403

Legislative history
- Introduced in the House as H.R. 15681 by Thomas E. Morgan (D–PA) on February 29, 1968; Committee consideration by House Foreign Affairs, Senate Foreign Relations; Passed the House on September 10, 1968 (312–29); Passed the Senate on October 10, 1968 (passed voice vote); Signed into law by President Lyndon B. Johnson on October 22, 1968

Major amendments
- Foreign Military Sales Act of 1971

The Foreign Military Sales Act of 1968, Pub. L. 90–629, 82 Stat. 1320-2, enacted October 22, 1968, was supplemental legislation to the Arms Control and Disarmament Act of 1961 and the Foreign Assistance Act of 1961. The Act discloses the United States commitment and sustainment to a world free from the dangers of armaments and the scourge of war.

The Foreign Military Sales Act supported the policy of regional arms control, disarmament agreements, and the discouragement of arm races. The H.R. 15681 bill authorized the sales of military equipment by the United States government. The United States law explicitly declares the sales of defense services and military articles to benevolent countries with the economic means to maintain and support a military force of adequate strength.

The H.R. 15681 legislation was passed by the 90th U.S. Congressional session and endorsed by the 36th President of the United States Lyndon Johnson on October 22, 1968.

== Provisions of the Act ==
The Foreign Military Sales Act established governance for United States foreign military sales authorizations and military export controls.

Foreign military sales authorizations specifies transaction criteria as;

- Cash sales from stock – The United States may sell defense articles from the stocks of the Department of Defense and defense services of the Department of Defense to any friendly country or international organization if such country or international organization agrees to pay not less than the value thereof in United States dollars.
- Procurement for cash sales – The United States may without requirement for charge to any appropriation or contract authorization otherwise provided, enter into contracts for the procurement of defense articles or defense services for sale for United States dollars to any friendly country or international organization if such country or international organization provides the United States government with a dependable undertaking.
- Credit sales – The United States is authorized to finance procurements of defense articles and defense services by friendly countries and international organizations on terms of repayment to the United States government of not less than the value thereof in United States dollars within a period not to exceed ten years after the delivery of the defense articles or the rendering of the defense services.
- Guaranties – The United States may guarantee any individual, corporation, partnership, or other juridical entity doing business in the United States (excluding United States government agencies) against political and credit risks of nonpayment arising out of their financing of credit sales of defense articles and defense services to friendly countries and international organizations. Fees shall be charged for such guaranties.

Military export controls specifies transaction criteria as;

- Authorization and aggregate ceiling on foreign military sales credits – There is authorized to be appropriated to the United States to carry out this Act not to exceed $296,000,000 for the fiscal year 1969. Unobligated balances of funds made available pursuant to this section are authorized to be continued available by appropriations legislation to carry out this Act. The aggregate total of credits or participation in credits, extended pursuant to this Act (excluding credits covered by guaranties), not exceed $296,000,000 for the fiscal year 1969.
- Prohibition against certain military export financing by export-import bank – Notwithstanding any other provision of law, no funds or borrowing authority available to the Export-Import Bank of the United States shall be used by such Bank to participate in any extension of credit in connection with any agreement to sell defense articles and defense services entered into with any economically less developed country after June 30, 1968.
- Regional ceilings on foreign military sales – The aggregate of the total amount of military assistance pursuant to the Foreign Assistance Act of 1961, as amended, of cash sales shall not exceed $75,000,000 in the fiscal year 1969 for Latin American countries and not exceed $40,000,000 in the fiscal year 1969 for African countries.
- Foreign military sales credit standards – The United States shall establish standards and criteria for credit and guaranty transactions in accordance with the foreign, national security, and financial policies of the United States.
- Foreign military sales to less developed countries – If the United States finds that any economically less developed country is diverting development assistance to military expenditures, or is diverting its own resources to unnecessary military expenditures, to a degree which materially interferes with its development, such country shall be immediately ineligible for further sales and guarantees until the United States is assured that such diversion will no longer take place.
- Reports on commercial and governmental military exports – The Secretary of State shall transmit to the Speaker of the House of Representatives and the Senate Committee on Foreign Relations semiannual reports of all exports during the preceding six months of significant defense articles on the United States munitions list to any foreign government, international organization, or other foreign recipient or purchaser, by the United States under this Act or any other authority, or by any individual, corporation, partnership, or other association doing business in the United States.
- Fiscal provisions relating to foreign military sales credits – Cash payments received shall be available solely for payments to suppliers (including the military departments) and refunds to purchasers and shall not be available for financing credits and guaranties. Amounts received from foreign governments and international organizations as repayments for credits, extended amounts received from the disposition of instruments evidencing indebtedness, and other collections (including fees and interest) shall be transferred to the miscellaneous receipts of the Treasury.

== See also ==
- Arms Export Control Act of 1976
- Defense Security Cooperation Agency
- Foreign Military Financing
- Foreign Military Sales
- Military–industrial complex
