= USML (disambiguation) =

The United States Munitions List (USML) describes categories of export-controlled material.

USML may also refer to:

- The University of Saint Mary of the Lake
- U.S. Microgravity Laboratory 1, Space Shuttle mission STS-50
- U.S. Microgravity Laboratory 2, Space Shuttle mission STS-73

== See also ==
- UMSL, the University of Missouri-St. Louis
