= Export Control Reform Act of 2018 =

United States federal law

- Other short titles: Export Controls Act of 2018
- Acronyms (colloquial): ECRA, ECA
- Enacted by: the 115th United States Congress
- Effective: August 13, 2018

Citations
- Public law: 115-232
- Statutes at Large: 132 Stat. 1636

Codification
- Acts repealed: Export Administration Act of 1979 (Except Sections 11A, 11B, and 11C).
- Titles amended: 50 U.S.C.: War and National Defense
- U.S.C. sections amended: 50 U.S.C. ch. Appendix - Export Regulation § 2401 et seq.

Legislative history
- Signed into law by President Donald Trump on August 13, 2018

The Export Control Reform Act of 2018 (ECRA) authorizes the American President to control exports for national security and foreign policy purposes. ECRA is the statutory basis for the Export Administration Regulations (EAR), which are administered by the Bureau of Industry and Security (BIS) in the Department of Commerce.

The act replaced the Export Administration Act of 1979, which expired in 2001. Between 2001 and 2018, the EAR were maintained using the International Emergency Economic Powers Act. Unlike its predecessors, ECRA does not contain a sunset provision and will remain in effect until amended or repealed.

ECRA reversed the decades-long trend toward the liberalization of U.S. export control policy. Whereas the Export Administration Act of 1969 and Export Administration Act of 1979 placed additional limits and introduced new procedural hurdles on the use of controls, ECRA encouraged the expansion of the U.S. export control regime.
