= Symington Amendment =

US nuclear legislation

The Symington Amendment is legislation introduced by Stuart Symington, a Democratic senator from Missouri, authored to strengthen the US position on nuclear non-proliferation.

== Background ==
The Foreign Assistance Act of 1961 was amended by the Symington Amendment (Section 669 of the FAA) in 1976. It banned U.S. economic, and military assistance, and export credits to countries that deliver or receive, acquire or transfer nuclear enrichment technology when they do not comply with IAEA regulations and inspections.

== Foreign Assistance Act of 1961 § 669 ==
NUCLEAR TRANSFERS

SEC. 305. Chapter 3 of part III of the Foreign Assistance Act of 1961 is amended by adding at the end thereof the following new section:

SEC. 669. NUCLEAR TRANSFERS.— (a) Except as provided in subsection (b), no funds authorized to be appropriated by this Act or the Arms Export Control Act may be used for the purpose of—

(1) providing economic assistance;

(2) providing military or security supporting assistance or grant military education and training; or

(3) extending military credits or making guarantees; to any country which—

(A) delivers nuclear reprocessing or enrichment equipment, materials, or technology to any other country; or

(B) receives such equipment, materials or technology from any other country; unless before such delivery—

(i) the supplying country and receiving country have reached agreement to place all such equipment, materials, and technology, upon delivery, under multilateral auspices and management when available; and

(ii) the recipient country has entered into an agreement with the International Atomic Energy Agency to place all such equipment, materials, technology, and all nuclear fuel and facilities in such country under the safeguards system of such Agency.

(b)(1) Not withstanding the provisions of subsection (a) of this section, the President may, by Executive order effective not less than 30 days following its date of promulgation, furnish assistance which would otherwise be prohibited under paragraph (1), (2), or (3) of such subsection if he determines and certifies in writing to the Speaker of the House of Representatives and the Committee on Foreign Relations of the Senate that—

(A) the termination of such assistance would have a serious adverse effect on vital United States interests; and

(B) he has received reliable assurances that the country in question will not acquire or develop nuclear weapons or assist other nations in doing so.

Such certification shall set forth the reasons supporting such determination in each particular case.

(2) (A) The Congress may by joint resolution terminate or restrict assistance described in paragraphs (1) through (3) of subsection (a) with respect to a country to which the prohibition in such subsection applies or take any other action with respect to such assistance for such country as it deems appropriate.

(B) Any such joint resolution with respect to a country shall, if introduced within 30 days after the transmittal of a certification under paragraph (1) with respect to such country, be considered in the Senate in accordance with the provisions of section 601(b) of the International Security Assistance and Arms Export Control Act of 1976.

— Stuart Symington, Symington Amendment (90 Stat. 755 - 90 Stat. 756), Arms Export Control Act of 1976

This provision, as amended, is now contained in Section 101 of the Arms Export Control Act (AECA). The Glenn Amendment (Section 670) was later adopted in 1977, and provided the same sanctions against countries that acquire or transfer nuclear reprocessing technology or explode or transfer a nuclear device. This provision, as amended, is now contained in Section 102 of the Arms Export Control Act (AECA).

== Arms Export Control Act § 101 ==
(a) PROHIBITIONS; SAFEGUARDS AND MANAGEMENT. —Except as provided in subsection (b) of this section, no funds made available to carry out the Foreign Assistance Act of 1961 or this Act may be used for the purpose of providing economic assistance (including assistance under chapter 4 of part II of the Foreign Assistance Act of 1961), providing military assistance or grant military education and training, providing assistance under chapter 6 of part II of that Act, or extending military credits or making guarantees, to any country which the President determines delivers nuclear enrichment equipment, materials, or technology to any other country on or after August 4, 1977, or receives such equipment, materials, or technology from any other country on or after August 4, 1977, unless before such delivery—

(1) the supplying country and receiving country have reached agreement to place all such equipment, materials, or technology, upon delivery, under multilateral auspices and management when available; and

(2) the recipient country has entered into an agreement with the International Atomic Energy Agency to place all such equipment, materials, technology, and all nuclear fuel and facilities in such country under the safeguards system of such Agency.

(b) CERTIFICATION BY PRESIDENT OF NECESSITY OF CONTINUED ASSISTANCE; DISAPPROVAL BY CONGRESS.—

(1) Notwithstanding subsection (a) of this section, the President may furnish assistance which would otherwise be prohibited under such subsection if he determines and certifies in writing to the Speaker of the House of Representatives and the Committee on Foreign Relations of the Senate that—

(A) the termination of such assistance would have a serious adverse effect on vital United States interests; and

(B) he has received reliable assurances that the country in question will not acquire or develop nuclear weapons or assist other nations in doing so. Such certification shall set forth the reasons supporting such determination in each particular case.

(2)(A) A certification under paragraph (1) of this subsection shall take effect on the date on which the certification is received by the Congress. However, if, within thirty calendar days after receiving this certification, the Congress enacts a joint resolution stating in substance that the Congress disapproves the furnishing of assistance pursuant to the certification, then upon the enactment of that resolution the certification shall cease to be effective and all deliveries of assistance furnished under the authority of that certification shall be suspended immediately.

(B) Any joint resolution under this paragraph shall be considered in the Senate in accordance with the provisions of section 601(b) of the International Security Assistance and Arms Export Control Act of 1976.

== Legal issues ==
Critics of U.S. foreign and defense policy in the post-WWII era have argued that the American government has violated the law by refusing to impose sanctions on its allies Israel, India and Pakistan over those countries declared (or in Israel's case, never officially confirmed) nuclear programs. Defenders of these policies ordinarily retort that the U.S. has either legally granted waivers in these cases or has refused to apply sanctions without what it deems to be a sufficient legal basis to do so.

== See also ==
- Arms Control and Disarmament Act of 1961
- Foreign Assistance Act
- Nuclear Non-Proliferation Act of 1978
