= Export Administration Regulations =

United States export guidelines and prohibitions

The Export Administration Regulations (EAR) are a set of United States export guidelines and prohibitions. They are administered by the Bureau of Industry and Security, which regulates the export restrictions of sensitive goods. The EAR apply to most U.S. origin items, foreign-produced items that incorporate controlled U.S. items, and certain "foreign-produced direct products" of U.S. items or technology, (e.g., foreign-made integrated circuits designed with U.S. electronic design automation software or manufactured with U.S.-made manufacturing equipment).

In general, there are three types of controls applied by the EAR:

1. Technology controls: These are controls based on the item being exported, these are usually listed on the Commerce Control List.
2. End-user controls: These are controls based on the ultimate end user, many of these end users are listed on the Entity List.
3. End-use controls: These are controls based on the ultimate end use of the control.

== Classification ==
=== Commerce Control List ===
The Commerce Control List (CCL) identifies specific items and technologies subject to export licensing requirements. Each item listed on the CCL is assigned an alphanumeric Export Control Classification Number (ECCN), such as 3A001, that describes it and indicates its licensing requirements. The CCL is divided into ten categories, each subdivided into five product groups.

Commerce Control List categories
0	Nuclear materials, facilities and equipment (and miscellaneous items)
1	Materials, chemicals, microorganisms and toxins
2	Materials processing
3	Electronics
4	Computers
5	Part 1 – Telecommunications; Part 2 – Information security
6	Sensors and lasers
7	Navigation and avionics
8	Marine
9	Aerospace and propulsion

Product groups
A	End items, equipment, accessories, attachments, parts, components, and systems
B	Test, inspection and production equipment
C	Materials
D	Software
E	Technology

=== EAR99 ===
The EAR99 designation covers the majority of items that fall under the regulations but are not listed in the CCL. These items are generally low-technology consumer goods not requiring a license, with some exceptions such as items sent to an embargoed country or an end-user of concern, or to be used for a prohibited end-use.

== Definitions ==
=== Export ===
With a few exceptions, the EAR defines export as:

1. A shipment or transmission out of the US, including sending or taking an item out of the US in any manner.
2. Releasing or transferring technology or source code (but not object code) to a foreign person in the US, which the EAR consider an export to the foreign person's most recent country of citizenship or residency.
3. The transfer of registration, control, or ownership of spacecraft by US personnel.
  - A spacecraft subject to the EAR that is not eligible for an exception (i.e. spacecraft that provide space-based logistics, assembly or servicing of any spacecraft) to a person in or a national of any other country; or
  - Any other spacecraft subject to the EAR to a person in or a national of a country subject to a US arms embargo (group D:5).

=== Technology ===
The EAR define technology as information necessary for the development, production, use, operation, installation, maintenance, repair, overhaul, or refurbishing (or other terms specified in ECCNs on the CCL that cover technology) of an item.

Technology may be tangible or intangible, and includes written or oral communications, blueprints, drawings, photographs, plans, diagrams, models, formulas, tables, engineering designs and specifications, computer-aided design files, manuals or documentation, and electronic media or information revealed through visual inspection.

== Ten general prohibitions ==
The EAR include a list of ten general prohibitions, which are summarized as follows:

=== General prohibition 1 ===
Items subject to the EAR cannot be exported nor can items of US-origin be re-exported to another country without a license or exception, if the items are controlled for a reason indicated by its ECCN, and export to the country requires a license, based on its country group.

=== General prohibition 2 ===
A person cannot, without a license or exception, export or re-export foreign-made commodities, software, or technology that incorporates controlled US-origin commodities, software, or technology if the items require a license and incorporate or are combined with more than a minimal amount of controlled US content, as defined in Title 15 of the Code of Federal Regulations (15 CFR) section 734.4.

=== General prohibition 3 ===
This prohibition applies to certain items that are produced outside of the US and that are the direct product of US technology or software, or they are developed from a plant that is the direct product of US technology or software.

A person may not, without a license or exception, re-export any item that meets the direct product test to a destination in the national security country group (D:1), designated terrorist supporting countries (E:1), or Cuba (E:2). Additionally, foreign-made military commodities that meet the direct product test cannot, without a license or exception, be re-exported or exported from abroad to a country in group D:1, the chemical and biological group (D:3), the missile technology group (D:4), D:5, E:1, or E:2.

=== General prohibition 4 ===
Actions cannot be taken that are prohibited by a denial order issued under 15 CFR section 766. Denial orders prohibit many actions in addition to direct exports by the person denied export privileges, including some transfers within a single country, either in the US or abroad, by other people. Any such person is responsible for ensuring that transactions which involve a person who is denied export privileges do not violate the order. Orders denying export privileges are legally binding documents that are published in the Federal Register. The BIS maintains a list of people denied export privileges and can, on an exceptional basis, authorize activity otherwise prohibited by a denial order. (Note: See 15 CFR section 764.3 (a) (2).)

=== General prohibition 5 ===
Items subject to the EAR cannot be exported or re-exported without a license to an end-user or end-use prohibited by 15 CFR section 744.

=== General prohibition 6 ===
Items subject to the EAR cannot be exported or re-exported to Cuba, North Korea, Russia (with respect to Russian oil and gas industries), Crimea, Iran, or Syria without a license or exception.

=== General prohibition 7 ===
US persons cannot perform certain activities related to nuclear explosive devices, missiles, chemical or biological weapons, or semiconductor equipment. (Note: As set out in 15 CFR section 744.6.)

=== General prohibition 8 ===
Exported or re-exported items cannot pass through any of the following countries without a license:

- Armenia
- Azerbaijan
- Belarus
- Cambodia
- Cuba
- Georgia
- Kazakhstan
- Kyrgyzstan
- Laos
- Mongolia
- North Korea
- Russia
- Tajikistan
- Turkmenistan
- Ukraine
- Uzbekistan
- Vietnam

=== General prohibition 9 ===
The terms or conditions of a license, exception, or order issued under the EAR cannot be violated.

=== General prohibition 10 ===
Items exported in a way that violates the EAR cannot be serviced. A license or exception that has been suspended or revoked cannot be relied upon.

== Scope ==
=== General applicability ===
Besides exceptions, the EAR apply to the following categories:

1. All items in the US, including in a US Foreign Trade Zone or moving in transit through the US from one foreign country to another
2. All US-origin items
3. Foreign-made commodities that contain controlled US-origin commodities or are bundled with controlled US-origin software, foreign-made software that is combined with controlled US-origin software, and foreign-made technology that is combined with controlled US-origin technology in certain quantities (Note: See the de minimis rules found in 15 CFR section 734.)
4. Certain foreign-made direct products of US origin technology or software (Note: As described in 15 CFR section 736.2 (b) (3).)
5. Certain commodities produced by a plant located outside the US that is a direct product of US-origin technology or software

=== Exceptions ===
The EAR do not apply to the following:

1. Items that are exclusively controlled for export or re-export by the following departments and agencies of the US Government which regulate exports or re-exports for national security or foreign policy purposes:
  - The Department of State: the ITAR administered by the Directorate of Defense Trade Controls relate to defense articles and defense services on the US Munitions List and section 38 of the Arms Export Control Act
  - The Office of Foreign Assets Control (OFAC)
  - The Nuclear Regulatory Commission (NRC), which controls the export and re-export of commodities related to nuclear reactor vessels, per the Atomic Energy Act of 1954
  - The Department of Energy (DOE), which controls the export and re-export of technology related to the production of special nuclear materials, per the Atomic Energy Act of 1954
  - The Patent and Trademark Office (PTO), which controls the export of unclassified technology in the form patent applications or amendments, modifications, supplements, or divisions of patents. The BIS has delegated authority under the Export Administration Act to the PTO.
  - The Department of Defense (DoD) and Department of State Foreign Military Sales (FMS) program: items that are sold, leased, or loaned by the DoD to a foreign country or international organization under the FMS program are subject to the Arms Export Control Act instead of the EAR.
2. Prerecorded phonograph records that include the content of printed books, pamphlets, and other publications.
3. Information and software that are published as described in 15 CFR section 734.7, arise or result from fundamental research, are released by instruction in a course or laboratory of an academic institution, appear in patents or published patent applications, unless covered by an invention secrecy order or other exception, are non-proprietary system descriptions, or are telemetry data. (Note: Defined in supplement 1 of 15 CFR section 774.)

=== Export regulations into China ===
Since 2018, Congress and the executive branch have revised – through legislation, regulation, and licensing practices – the export control system that regulates dual-use exports. Much of the reform has focused on controlling emerging and foundational technologies, strengthening other technology controls and licensing practices, engaging multilaterally to ensure US controls are effective, and considering the impact of controls on the economy, including the foreign availability of US products subject to control. Export control covers the whole territory of the People's Republic of China, including Hong Kong and Macau.

== See also ==
- International Traffic in Arms Regulations
- Denied trade screening
- United States sanctions
- Export Control Act
