= Arms Control and Disarmament Act =

Arms Control and Disarmament Act may refer to:

- Arms Control and Disarmament Act of 1961
- 22 U.S.C. § 2551 Title IV : Arms Control and Disarmament Act (amendments 1991)
