= Cooper–Church Amendment =

Amendment to a military spending bill in 1970

The Cooper–Church Amendment was introduced in the United States Senate during the Vietnam War. The amendment sought to cut off all funding to American war efforts in Cambodia. Its proposal was the first time that Congress had restricted the deployment of troops during a war against the wishes of the president.

== Background and congressional action ==
The amendment was presented by Senators John Sherman Cooper (R–KY) and Frank Church (D–ID) and attached to a major bill, the Foreign Military Sales Act of 1971. The proposal was introduced in response to the recent Cambodian Incursion, including Operations Binh Tay 1/Tame the West and Freedom Deal. Senators Church and Cooper were several of the first politicians to begin openly and adamantly opposing the war in Vietnam. Their amendment sought to:

1. End funding to retain U.S. ground troops and military advisors in Cambodia and Laos after 30 June 1970
2. Bar air operations in Cambodian airspace in direct support of Cambodian forces without congressional approval
3. End American support for Republic of Vietnam forces outside territorial South Vietnam.

The Cooper-Church amendment received support from both sides in the Senate including backing from Mike Mansfield, Jacob K. Javits, William S. Symington, and J. William Fulbright. A majority of the supporters saw the amendment as an overdue attempt to reassert Congress’ constitutional control over the power to make war, while the Nixon administration condemned it as an unconstitutional intrusion into the President’s power as commander-in-chief. After a seven-week filibuster and six months of debate, the amendment was approved by the Senate by a vote of 58 to 37 on 30 June 1970. The bill failed in the House of Representatives, which opposed inclusion of the amendment by a vote of 237 to 153. President Nixon threatened to veto the bill if it contained the Cooper–Church provisions, and the foreign assistance bill was subsequently passed without it.

== Revisions ==
A revised Cooper–Church amendment, Public Law 91-652, passed both houses of Congress on 22 December 1970, and was enacted on 5 January 1971, although this version had limited restrictions on air operations and was attached to the Supplementary Foreign Assistance Act of 1970. By that time, U.S. ground forces had already officially withdrawn from Cambodia, while U.S. bombing missions in Cambodia continued until 1973. The revised bill also included an amendment that repealed the Gulf of Tonkin Resolution, however this turned out to be insignificant as the Nixon administration cited the President’s constitutional powers as commander-in-chief rather than the resolution as the basis for his war making authority. President Nixon denounced all versions of the amendment, claiming that they harmed the military effort and weakened the American bargaining position at the Paris peace talks.

Author David F. Schmitz stated that the amendment was a landmark in the history of opposition to the war, congressional initiatives to bring the fighting to an end, and efforts to control executive power in foreign policy.

== See also ==
- Case–Church Amendment
- McGovern–Hatfield Amendment
- Nixon Doctrine
- Opposition to the Vietnam War
