= EURATOM Cooperation Act of 1958 =

United States declaration regarding nuclear power in Europe

- Long title: An Act to provide for cooperation with the European Atomic Energy Community.
- Nicknames: European Atomic Energy Community Cooperation Act
- Enacted by: the 85th United States Congress
- Effective: August 28, 1958

Citations
- Public law: 85-846
- Statutes at Large: 72 Stat. 1084

Codification
- Titles amended: 42 U.S.C.: Public Health and Social Welfare
- U.S.C. sections created: 42 U.S.C. §§ 2291–2296

Legislative history
- Introduced in the Senate as S. 4273 on August 14, 1958; Passed the Senate on August 18, 1958 (passed voice vote); Passed the House on August 20, 1958 (passed voice vote, in lieu of H.R. 13749); Signed into law by President Dwight D. Eisenhower on August 28, 1958

EURATOM Cooperation Act of 1958 is a United States statute which created a cooperative program between the European Atomic Energy Community and the United States. In pursuant of the Atomic Energy Act of 1954, the cooperative program was an international agreement provisioning United States policy to establish power plants utilizing nuclear power technology within the European Atomic Energy Community territory. In accordance with the Act, the cooperative agreement sanctioned a civilian nuclear energy research and development program for the evaluation and observation of nuclear reactors selected by the Atomic Energy Commission and the European Atomic Energy Community.

The S. 4273 legislation was passed by the 85th Congressional session and enacted into law by the 34th President of the United States Dwight D. Eisenhower on August 28, 1958.

== Provisions of the Act ==
The EURATOM Cooperation Act authorized several key elements for the cooperative international agreement between the European Atomic Energy Community and the United States.

=== Definitions ===
Members of the European Atomic Energy Community

(a) The Community means the European Atomic Energy Community (EURATOM) consisting of Belgium, France, Italy, Luxembourg, Netherlands, and West Germany.
(b) The Commission means the Atomic Energy Commission (AEC), as established by the Atomic Energy Act of 1954
(c) Joint program means the cooperative program established by the Community and the United States and carried out in accordance with the provisions of an agreement for cooperation entered into pursuant of the Atomic Energy Act of 1954 to bring into operation in the territory of the members of the Community power plants using nuclear reactors of types selected by the Commission and the Community, having as a goal a total installed capacity of approximately 1,000,000 kilowatts (1.0×10^{9} W) of electricity by December 31, 1963, except that two reactors may be selected to be in operation by December 31, 1965.
(d) All other terms used in this Act shall have the same meaning as terms described in the Atomic Energy Act of 1954.

=== Research and Development Program ===
There is authorized to be appropriated to the Commission the sum of $3,000,000 as an initial authorization for fiscal year 1959 for use in a cooperative program of research and development in connection with the types of reactors selected by the Commission and the Community under the joint program. The Commission may enter into contracts for such periods as it deems necessary, but in no event to exceed five years, for the purpose of conducting the research and development program authorized by this section : Provided That the Community authorizes an equivalent amount for use in the cooperative program of research and development.

=== Guarantee Contracts ===
The Commission is authorized, within limits of amounts which may hereafter be authorized to be appropriated in accordance with the provisions of the Atomic Energy Act of 1954, to make guarantee contracts which shall in the aggregate not exceed a total contingent liability of $90,000,000 designed to assure that the charges to an operator of a reactor constructed under the joint program for fabricating, processing, and transporting fuel will be no greater than would result under the fuel fabricating and fuel life guarantees which the Commission shall establish for such reactor. Within the limits of such amounts, the Commission is authorized to make contracts under this section, without regard to the provisions of the Revised Statutes, for such periods of time as it determines to be necessary : Provided however, that no such contracts may extend for a period longer than that necessary to cover fuel loaded into a reactor constructed under the joint program during the first ten years of the reactor operation or prior to December 31, 1973 (or December 31, 1976, for not more than two reactors selected, whichever is earlier. In establishing criteria for the selection of projects and in entering into such guarantee contracts, the Commission shall be guided by, but not limited to, the following principles :

(a) The Commission shall encourage a strong and competitive atomic equipment manufacturing industry in the United States designed to provide diversified sources of supply for reactor parts and reactor fuel elements under the joint program.
(b) The guarantee shall be consistent with the provisions of this Act and of Attachment A to the Memorandum of Understanding between the Government of the United States and the Community, signed in Brussels on May 29, 1958, and in Washington, District of Columbia, on June 12, 1958, and transmitted to United States Congress on June 23, 1958.
(c) The Commission shall establish and publish minimum levels of fuel element cost and life to be guaranteed by the manufacturer as a basis for inviting and evaluating proposals.
(d) The guarantee by the manufacturer shall be as favorable as any other guarantee offered by the manufacturer for any comparable fuel element within a reasonable time period.
(e) The Commission shall obtain a royalty-free, non-exclusive, irrevocable license for governmental purposes to any patents on inventions or discoveries made or conceived by the manufacturer in the course of development or fabrication of fuel elements during the period covered by the Commission's guarantee.

=== Nuclear Material Sale or Lease ===
There is authorized for sale or lease to the Community :

- 30,000 kilograms (66,000 lb) of contained Uranium-235
- 1 kilogram (2.2 lb) of plutonium

in accordance with the provisions of an agreement for cooperation between the Government of the United States and the Community entered into pursuant of the Atomic Energy Act of 1954 : Provided That the Government of the United States obtains the equivalent of a first lien on any such nuclear material sold to the Community for which payment is not made in full at the time of transfer.

=== Acquisition of Nuclear Materials ===
(a) The Atomic Energy Commission is authorized to purchase or otherwise acquire from the Community special nuclear material or any interest therein from reactors constructed under the joint program in accordance with the terms of an agreement for cooperation entered into pursuant of the Atomic Energy Act of 1954 : Provided That neither plutonium nor Uranium-233 nor any interest therein shall be acquired under this section in excess of the total quantities authorized by law. The Commission is authorized to acquire from the Community pursuant to this section up to 4,100 kilograms (9,000 lb) of plutonium for use only for peaceful purposes.
(b) Any contract made under the provisions of this section to acquire plutonium or any interest therein may be at such prices and for such period of time as the Commission may deem necessary : Provided That with respect to plutonium produced in any reactor constructed under the joint program, no such contract shall be for a period greater than ten years of operation of such reactors or December 31, 1973 (or December 31, 1975, for not more than two reactors, whichever is earlier : And provided further that no such contract shall provide for compensation or the payment of a purchase price in excess of the Commission's established price in effect at the time of delivery to the Commission for such material as fuel in a nuclear reactor.
(c) Any contract made under the provisions of this section to acquire uranium enriched in the isotope uranium 235 may be at such price and for such period of time as the Commission may deem necessary : Provided That no such contract shall be for a period of time extending beyond the terminal date of the agreement for cooperation with the Community or provide for the acquisition of uranium enriched in the isotope U-235 in excess of the quantities of such material that have been distributed to the Community by the Commission less the quantity consumed in the nuclear reactors involved in the joint program : And provided further that no such contract shall provide for compensation or the payment of a purchase price in excess of the Atomic Energy Commission's established charges for such material in effect at the time delivery is made to the Commission.
(d) Any contract made under this section for the purchase of special nuclear material or any interest therein may be made without regard to the provisions of the Revised Statutes.
(e) Any contract made under this section may be made without regard to the Revised Statutes, upon certification by the Commission that such action is necessary in the interest of the common defense and security, or upon a showing by the Commission that advertising is not reasonably practicable.

=== Nonliability of U.S. ===
The Government of the United States of America shall not be liable for any damages or third party liability arising out of or resulting from the joint program : Provided however, that nothing in this section shall deprive any person of any rights under the Atomic Energy Act of 1954. The Government of the United States shall take such steps as may be necessary, including appropriate disclaimer or indemnity arrangements, in order to carry out the provisions of this section.

== Amendments to 1958 Act ==
Chronological amendments to the EURATOM Cooperation Act of 1958.

U.S. Statutes for Coordination of EURATOM Community

| Date of Enactment | Public Law No. | U.S. Statute Citation | U.S. Bill | U.S. Presidential Administration |
|---|---|---|---|---|
| September 6, 1961 | P.L. 87-206 | 75 Stat. 475 | H.R. 8599 | John F. Kennedy |
| August 1, 1964 | P.L. 88-394 | 78 Stat. 376 | S. 2963 | Lyndon B. Johnson |
| December 14, 1967 | P.L. 90-190 | 81 Stat. 575 | S. 2644 | Lyndon B. Johnson |
| August 14, 1973 | P.L. 93-88 | 87 Stat. 296 | S. 1993 | Richard M. Nixon |

== EURATOM and U.S. Presidential Statements ==
Europe Nuclear Energy and U.S. Presidential Statements

◇ Eisenhower, Dwight D. (June 23, 1958). "Special Message to the Congress Transmitting International Agreement Between the United States and Euratom - June 23, 1958". Internet Archive. Washington, D.C.: National Archives and Records Service. pp. 494–497.
◇ Eisenhower, Dwight D. (July 31, 1958). "Statement by the President Concerning the Second International Conference on the Peaceful Uses of Atomic Energy - July 31, 1958". Internet Archive. Washington, D.C.: National Archives and Records Service. pp. 576–577.
◇ Johnson, Lyndon B. (February 2, 1966). "Statement by the President Announcing an Increase in Enriched Uranium To Be Made Available for Peaceful Uses - February 2, 1966". Internet Archive. Washington, D.C.: National Archives and Records Service. pp. 138–139.
◇ Carter, Jimmy E. (February 7, 1980). "Exports of Nuclear Fuels - February 7, 1980" [Letter to the Speaker of the House and the President of the Senate]. Internet Archive. Washington, D.C.: National Archives and Records Service. pp. 286–287.

== Nuclear Cooperation With EURATOM ==
United States Authorizations for International Cooperation with EURATOM Community

| Date of Authorization | Executive Order No. | U.S. Presidential Administration |
|---|---|---|
| February 12, 1980 | EO 12193 | Jimmy Carter |
| February 24, 1981 | EO 12295 | Ronald Reagan |
| March 9, 1982 | EO 12351 | Ronald Reagan |
| March 7, 1983 | EO 12409 | Ronald Reagan |
| February 23, 1984 | EO 12463 | Ronald Reagan |
| March 4, 1985 | EO 12506 | Ronald Reagan |
| February 28, 1986 | EO 12554 | Ronald Reagan |
| March 9, 1987 | EO 12587 | Ronald Reagan |
| March 9, 1988 | EO 12629 | Ronald Reagan |
| March 9, 1989 | EO 12670 | George H.W. Bush |
| March 9, 1990 | EO 12706 | George H.W. Bush |
| March 8, 1991 | EO 12753 | George H.W. Bush |
| March 9, 1992 | EO 12791 | George H.W. Bush |
| March 9, 1993 | EO 12840 | William J. Clinton |
| March 9, 1994 | EO 12903 | William J. Clinton |
| March 9, 1995 | EO 12955 | William J. Clinton |

== See also ==
- Euratom Treaty
- European Nuclear Energy Tribunal
- Nuclear Energy Agency
- Nuclear Non-Proliferation Act of 1978
- Treaty of Rome
