= Foreign Military Sales =

United States Department of Defense program

Foreign Military Sales (FMS) is a security assistance program of the United States government to facilitate the purchase of U.S. arms, defense equipment, design and construction services, and military training by foreign governments. FMS is a government-to-government program where the United States Department of Defense through the Defense Security Cooperation Agency (DSCA) acquires defense articles on behalf of the foreign governments, protecting them from contract risks in negotiating with the arms industry and providing the contract benefits and protections that apply to U.S. military acquisitions. The FMS program was established through the 1976 Arms Export Control Act (AECA) and is overseen by the United States Department of State and the United States Congress through the annual Foreign Operations Appropriations Acts and National Defense Authorization Acts.

The DSCA describes FMS as "a fundamental tool of U.S. foreign policy." FMS was the primary channel for U.S. arms exports until the 1980s, when the limits on the size of permitted Direct Commercial Sales (DCS) was lifted. DCS was seen by buyers to be faster, more cost-effective and less-transparent than FMS. By 1989, DCS surpassed FMS in value. However, the Gulf War reversed the decline in FMS and by FY 1992–93, DCS had dropped to one-fifth of U.S. arms sales.

In FY 2020, U.S. military-industry base sold $50.8 billion through FMS and $124.3 billion through Direct Commercial Sales. In 2023, the U.S. recorded the highest annual sales of U.S. military equipment to foreign governments, carried out under the FMS system, valued at $80.9 billion. This marked a 55.9% increase compared to the $51.9 billion recorded in 2022. FMS is carried out with countries that are authorized to participate and is subject to approval based on the mechanism to procure services, a deposit in a U.S. trust fund or appropriate credit, and approval to fund services. On any given day, DSCA is managing “14,000 open foreign military sales cases with 185 countries,” the DSCA director Lieutenant General Charles Hooper explained at the Brookings Institution in June 2019.

== Foreign Military Sales process ==
The State Department, through its Bureau of Political-Military Affairs (PM), is responsible for the administration of FMS while the Defense Department through the DSCA is responsible for its implementation. DSCA coordinates with PM to review and consult with Congress to receive formal agreement with an eligible foreign government.

=== Letter of Request (LOR) ===
Foreign governments submit a Letter of Request (LOR) to a U.S. government Security Cooperation Organization (SCO), typically the Office of Defense Cooperation within the U.S. embassy in that country or directly to the DSCA or to a U.S. military department (Department of the Army, Department of the Navy or Department of the Air Force) or another Defense Department agency. There are three types of LORs : LOR for Price and Availability (P&A) for the foreign government to obtain basic information for further planning; LOR for a Letter of Offer and Acceptance (LOA), an official expression of interest by a foreign country; and LOR for a change to an already existing LOA for making amendments to existing LORs.

==== FMS case identifiers ====
An FMS case identifier that consists of a country, the code of an implementing agency (Army, Navy or Air Force) and a unique three-position FMS case designator is assigned to each LOR. For example, U.S. Air Force (USAF) FMS programs are assigned two-word code names beginning with the word PEACE, indicating oversight by USAF headquarters.

=== Letter of Offer and Acceptance (LOA) ===
The FMS case is reviewed by the implementing agency and DSCA to ensure compliance with the requirements of the LOR and U.S. laws and regulations. If approved by the implementing agency and the DSCA, the Letter of Offer and Acceptance (LOA) is submitted to the State Department for its review and approval. The LOA is also transmitted to the foreign government for its review and approval.

==== Pricing ====
FMS sales are required to be cost-neutral to the U.S. government. To cover the costs incurred by the government to process an FMS, administrative surcharges, Contract Administration Services (CAS), Non-recurring costs (NC) and other fees are included in the payment schedule described in the LOA.

==== Payment ====
The LOA includes an estimated payment schedule for the foreign government that typically consists of an initial deposit and future quarterly payments. Methods of payment typically consist of Foreign Military Financing, the foreign government's funds or an existing Memorandum of Agreement (MOA) or Memorandum of Understanding (MOU) with the United States. Payments are made to the Defense Finance and Accounting Service (DFAS) in the United States dollar through check or wire transfer.

=== Delivery ===
After the acceptance of the LOA by the foreign government, the implementing agency is authorised by the Defense Finance and Accounting Service (DFAS) to obligate funds to execute the FMS and begin the procurement of the defense articles and/or services. Major FMS cases can include the procurement of items from existing U.S. government stocks and new production. Procurement for a foreign government is typically managed by the same office responsible for the procurement of an article for the U.S. government.

According to Defense Department policy, the purchaser is responsible for the transportation and delivery of purchased articles. Purchasers can either use the Defense Transportation System (DTS) on a reimbursable basis or use their own freight forwarder to manage the transportation and delivery.

=== Congressional notification requirements ===
Section 36(b) (22 U.S.C. §2776(b)) of the AECA specifies that Congress must be notified about arms sales 30 days before the issuance of a Letter of Offer and Acceptance (LOA) for defense equipment valued at $14 million of more, defense articles or services valued at $50 million or more, or design and construction services valued at $200 million or more. Congress must also be notified 15 days before the issuance of an LOA to NATO members, Japan, Australia, South Korea, Israel or New Zealand for the sale, enhancement, or upgrading of major defense equipment valued at $25 million or more, defense articles or services at $100 million or more, or design and construction services of $300 million or more. Congress has the authority to block a sale.

==== Waivers ====
On 24 May 2019, Secretary of state Mike Pompeo invoked AECA Section 36 emergency provisions to complete "22 pending arms transfers" worth $8.1 billion to Jordan, Saudi Arabia and the United Arab Emirates (UAE) to "deter Iranian aggression". On 24 July, President Donald Trump vetoed the S.J.Res. 36 (prohibiting co-production of Paveway bombs), S.J.Res. 37 (prohibiting transfer of maintenance services for the AGM-65 Maverick missile and Paveway systems) and S.J.Res. 38 (prohibiting transfer of technical data to support the manufacturing of the Aurora Fuzing System for the Paveway IV bomb). On July 29, a Senate vote failed to override the vetoes.

On 24 April 2022, the DSCA notified Congress that Secretary of State Antony Blinken had determined that "an emergency exists requiring the sale of non-standard ammunition" to Ukraine "in the national security interest of the United States" to invoke the AECA Section 36 emergency waiver provision.

On 8 December 2023, DSCA notified Congress that Secretary Blinken had determined "an emergency exists which requires the immediate sale" of 155 mm artillery rounds and "related equipment" and 120 mm tank shells to Israel to invoke the AECA Section 36(b) emergency waiver.

== End-use monitoring ==
Foreign governments must agree to U.S.-provided defense articles, training and services only for their intended purpose. End-use monitoring (EUM) is typically performed by U.S. government personnel assigned to the Security Cooperation Office in the foreign country.

== See also ==
- Foreign Military Sales Act of 1968
- Foreign Military Sales Act of 1971
- List of F-16 FMS programs
- United States Foreign Military Financing
