= Arms Control and Disarmament Act of 1961 =

US federal legislation

- Long title: An Act to establish a United States Arms Control and Disarmament Agency.
- Nicknames: Arms Control and Disarmament Act
- Enacted by: the 87th United States Congress
- Effective: September 26, 1961

Citations
- Public law: 87-297
- Statutes at Large: 75 Stat. 631

Codification
- Titles amended: 22 U.S.C.: Foreign Relations and Intercourse
- U.S.C. sections created: 22 U.S.C. ch. 35 § 2551

Legislative history
- Introduced in the House as H.R. 9118 by Thomas E. Morgan (D-PA) on September 12, 1961; Committee consideration by House Foreign Affairs, Senate Foreign Relations; Passed the Senate on September 8, 1961 (73–14, in lieu of S. 2180); Passed the House on September 19, 1961 (290–54); Reported by the joint conference committee on September 23, 1961; agreed to by the House on September 23, 1961 (253–50) and by the Senate on agreed; Signed into law by President John F. Kennedy on September 26, 1961

The Arms Control and Disarmament Act of 1961, 22 U.S.C. § 2551, was created to establish a governing body for the control and reduction of apocalyptic armaments with regards to protect a world from the burdens of armaments and the scourge of war.

The Act was passed by the 87th Congress and signed by the President John F. Kennedy on September 26, 1961.

== Provisions of the Act ==
The Arms Control and Disarmament Act established the Arms Control and Disarmament Agency (ACDA). The U.S. federal organization developed the formulation and implementation of the United States arms control and disarmament policy. The agency provided information and recommendations with regards to U.S. economic, foreign, and national security policies to executive and legislative officials of the United States government.

The Act established several core functions for the Arms Control and Disarmament Agency;

- Conduct, coordinate, and support the research of the formulation for the arms control and disarmament policy.
- Management and preparation of the United States participation in international negotiations for the arms control and disarmament peace process.
- Coordination and dissemination of United States public information concerning arms control and disarmament policy.
- Operation and preparation, as appropriate, for the United States participation in control systems of domestic and international arms control and disarmament activities.

== Titles of the Act ==
The federal statute was penned as four titles created as Chapter 35 within Title 22 which defines the United States foreign policies for international relations and intercourse records.

=== Title I — Short Title, Purpose, and Definitions ===
22 U.S.C. § 2551 ~ Purpose of Act
22 U.S.C. § 2552 ~ Definitions of Act

=== Title II — Organization ===
22 U.S.C. § 2561 ~ Establishment of agency
22 U.S.C. § 2562 ~ Director
22 U.S.C. § 2563 ~ Deputy Director
22 U.S.C. § 2564 ~ Assistant Directors
22 U.S.C. § 2565 ~ Bureaus, Offices, and Divisions
22 U.S.C. § 2566 ~ General Advisory Committee

=== Title III — Functions ===
22 U.S.C. § 2571 ~ Research
22 U.S.C. § 2572 ~ Patents
22 U.S.C. § 2573 ~ Policy formulation
22 U.S.C. § 2574 ~ Negotiations and related functions
22 U.S.C. § 2575 ~ Coordination

=== Title IV — General Provisions ===
22 U.S.C. § 2581 ~ General authority
22 U.S.C. § 2582 ~ Foreign Service Reserve and staff officers
22 U.S.C. § 2583 ~ Contracts or expenditures
22 U.S.C. § 2584 ~ Conflict of interest and dual compensation laws
22 U.S.C. § 2585 ~ Security requirements
22 U.S.C. § 2586 ~ Comptroller General audit
22 U.S.C. § 2587 ~ Transfer of activities and facilities to agency
22 U.S.C. § 2588 ~ Use of funds
22 U.S.C. § 2589 ~ Appropriation
22 U.S.C. § 2590 ~ Report to Congress

== Amendments to 1961 Act ==
Chronological timeline of authorizations for U.S. Congressional legislation related to United States arms control and disarmament provisions.

| Date of Enactment | U.S. Public Law | U.S. Statute | U.S. Bill | U.S. Presidential Administration |
|---|---|---|---|---|
| November 26, 1963 | P.L. 88-186 | 77 Stat. 341 | S. 777 | Lyndon B. Johnson |
| May 22, 1965 | P.L. 89-27 | 79 Stat. 117 | H.R. 2998 | Lyndon B. Johnson |
| May 23, 1968 | P.L. 90-314 | 82 Stat. 129 | H.R. 14940 | Lyndon B. Johnson |
| May 12, 1970 | P.L. 91-246 | 84 Stat. 207 | S. 3544 | Richard M. Nixon |
| July 8, 1974 | P.L. 93-332 | 88 Stat. 289 | H.R. 12799 | Richard M. Nixon |
| August 17, 1977 | P.L. 95-108 | 91 Stat. 871 | H.R. 6179 | Jimmy E. Carter |
| December 2, 1983 | P.L. 98-202 | 97 Stat. 1381 | H.R. 2906 | Ronald W. Reagan |
| December 24, 1987 | P.L. 100-213 | 101 Stat. 1444 | H.R. 2689 | Ronald W. Reagan |
| December 11, 1989 | P.L. 101-216 | 103 Stat. 1853 | H.R. 1495 | George H.W. Bush |

== See also ==
| Armed Forces Special Weapons Project | Nuclear disarmament |
| Arms Export Control Act | Nuclear Non-Proliferation Act of 1978 |
| Atomic Energy Act of 1954 | Soviet Nuclear Threat Reduction Act of 1991 |
| Foreign Military Sales Act of 1968 | Strategic and Critical Materials Stock Piling Act of 1939 |
| Foreign Military Sales Act of 1971 | Symington Amendment |
| Nuclear arms race | Uranium Mill Tailings Radiation Control Act |

== Historical Video Archive ==
"71972 1983 Nuclear Arms Control Regime Film / Nuclear Safeguards". Periscope Film. U.S. Arms Control and Disarmament Agency. 1983.
