= Bruce Lusignan =

American engineer (born 1936)

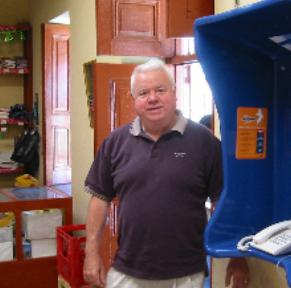
Lusignan in rural Peru, satellite dish installation project.

Bruce Lusignan (1936 – October 27, 2025) was an emeritus associate professor of electrical engineering at Stanford University and a visiting professor at Portland State University. He earned his B.S.E.E ('58), M.S.E.E. ('59) and Ph.D. ('63) degrees from Stanford. In the early 1960s, he worked in radio astronomy at Stanford. He has been director of Stanford's Communication Satellite Planning Center and Stanford's Center for International Cooperation in Space. He has also owned a small company designing cellular phones and pagers.

His areas of specialization were communications satellites, telephone switches, cellular networks and the related signal processing problems. He is inventor or co-inventor on 16 patents, including devices for metering power, RF signal reception, satellite transceivers, alarm systems for cellular base stations, tone generators for telephony, and VSAT terminals.

He worked on designs for reusable launch vehicles based on the Black Horse concept. and helped direct planning efforts for international cooperation on Mars exploration with the then-Soviet Union. He led later post-Soviet cooperation in planning for an international Mars mission that included a space logistics function for ICBMs: using missiles such as the SS-18 to pre-position fuel and other supplies in Earth orbit, and Russia's Energia booster to send the supplies to Mars ahead of the crew.

Lusignan also took a strong interest in the politics and issues that arise in economic development, including sustainable development in Africa, earthquake relief and reconstruction in Peru, and rural telecommunications in the Middle East. For a number of years he ran EDGE – "Ethics of Development in a Global Environment" – a weekly seminar at Stanford about issues in international conflict, trade, environmental sustainability, and amelioration of poverty and racism.

In 1982, he was one of a number of professors who, with the support of their institutions, openly defied restrictions on use of otherwise-publicly available materials rationalized via the Arms Export Control Act.

== Bibliography ==
- Lusignan, Bruce; Kiely, John (1970). Global weather prediction: the coming revolution. Holt, Rinehart and Winston. ISBN 9780030827990.
