= Foreign Military Sales Act of 1971 =

- Long title: An Act to amend the Foreign Military Sales Act, and for other purposes.
- Nicknames: Foreign Military Sales Act Amendments
- Enacted by: the 91st United States Congress
- Effective: January 12, 1971

Citations
- Public law: 91-672
- Statutes at Large: 84 Stat. 2053

Codification
- Acts amended: Foreign Military Sales Act of 1968
- Titles amended: 22 U.S.C.: Foreign Relations and Intercourse
- U.S.C. sections amended: 22 U.S.C. ch. 32 §§ 2151, 2301, 2314, 2403; 22 U.S.C. ch. 39 §§ 2751, 2753

Legislative history
- Introduced in the House as H.R. 15628 on January 29, 1970; Passed the House on March 24, 1970 (351-26); Passed the Senate on June 30, 1970 (75-20); Reported by the joint conference committee on July 9, 1970; agreed to by the House on July 9, 1970 (247-143); Signed into law by President Richard Nixon on January 12, 1971

The Foreign Military Sales Act of 1971, Pub. L. 91–672, 84 Stat. 2053, enacted January 12, 1971, was created as an amendment to the Foreign Military Sales Act of 1968. The Act of 1971 established declarations to promote international peace and national security for economic, political, and social progress. The declaration provided coordination for international armament appropriations meeting the objectives of the Nixon Administration's foreign policy.

The H.R. 15628 legislation supported multilateral discussions between countries concerning the control of conventional armaments and restraints for the worldwide arms trade. The United States legislation provided provisions for negotiations with the Soviet Union on the limitation of arms shipments to the Middle East and global trade of international fighter aircraft. The Act of Congress authorized a repeal of the Gulf of Tonkin Resolution.

The H.R. 15628 bill was passed by the 91st U.S. Congressional session and endorsed by the 37th President of the United States Richard M. Nixon on January 12, 1971.

== Provisions of the Act ==
The Foreign Military Sales Act of 1971 appropriations and resolutions as stated by the Act.

- Waiver and report - No sales, credits, or guaranties shall be made or extended to any country during a period of one year after such country seizes, takes into custody, or fines an American fishing vessel engaging in fishing more than twelve miles from the coast of that country. The President of the United States may waive the provisions when determined to be important to the security of the United States or the President receives reasonable assurances from the country involved that future violations will not occur, and promptly reports to the Speaker of the House of Representatives and the Senate Committee on Foreign Relations.
- Ceiling on foreign military sales credits - There is authorized to be appropriated to the United States to carry out this Act not to exceed $250,000,000 for each of the fiscal years 1970 and 1971. Unobligated balances of funds made available are authorized to be continued available by appropriations legislation to carry out this Act. The aggregate total of credits or participation in credits, extended under this Act (excluding credits covered by guaranties), shall not exceed $340,000,000 for each of the fiscal years 1970 and 1971.
- Policy statement - It is the sense of Congress that sales and guaranties shall not be approved where they would have the effect of arming military dictators who are denying the growth of fundamental rights or social progress to their people.
- Conventional arms trade - The President of the United States should take action as appropriate to initiate multilateral discussions among France, Great Britain, Italy, the Union of Soviet Socialist Republics, West Germany, and other countries with regard to control the international trade of armaments. The United States was to commence a general debate in the United Nations with respect to the control of the conventional arms trade.
- International fighter aircraft - The sale, grant, loan, or transfer of any international fighter aircraft authorized by and made in accordance with the Foreign Military Sales Act or the Foreign Assistance Act of 1961, or is a regular commercial transaction (not financed by the United States) between a party other than the United States and a foreign country, no such aircraft may be sold, granted, loaned, or otherwise transferred to any foreign country (or agency thereof) other than South Vietnam.
- Gulf of Tonkin Resolution - The joint resolution entitled "Joint resolution to promote the maintenance of international peace and security in Southeast Asia", approved August 10, 1964, is terminated effective upon the day that the second session of the 91st Congress is last adjourned.
- Chemical munitions transportation - No funds authorized or appropriated pursuant to this or any other law may be used to transport chemical munitions from the Island of Okinawa to the United States. Such funds as are necessary for the detoxification or destruction of the above described chemical munitions are authorized and shall be used for the detoxification or destruction of chemical munitions only outside the United States.

== See also ==
- Arms Export Control Act of 1976
- Cooper–Church Amendment
- Defense Security Cooperation Agency
- Foreign Military Financing
- Foreign Military Sales
- Military–industrial complex
- Nixon Doctrine
- Strategic and Critical Materials Stock Piling Act of 1939
