= Export Administration Act of 1979 =

Former United States federal law

- Long title: An Act to provide authority to regulate exports, to improve the efficiency of export regulation, and to minimize interference with the ability to engage in commerce.
- Acronyms (colloquial): EAA
- Nicknames: Export Administration Act Amendments of 1979
- Enacted by: the 96th United States Congress
- Effective: September 29, 1979

Citations
- Public law: 96-72
- Statutes at Large: 93 Stat. 503

Codification
- Titles amended: 50 U.S.C.: War and National Defense
- U.S.C. sections amended: 50 U.S.C. ch. Appendix - Export Regulation § 2401 et seq.

Legislative history
- Introduced in the Senate as S. 737 by Adlai Stevenson, III (D–IL) on March 22, 1979; Committee consideration by Senate Banking, Housing, and Urban Affairs; Passed the Senate on July 21, 1979 (74-3); Passed the House on September 25, 1979 (passed, in lieu of H.R. 4034); Reported by the joint conference committee on September 27, 1979; agreed to by the Senate on September 27, 1979 (agreed) and by the House on September 28, 1979 (321-19); Signed into law by President Jimmy Carter on September 29, 1979

The Export Administration Act (EAA) of 1979 (P.L. 96-72) authorized to the President to control U.S. exports for national security, foreign policy, and short supply purposes. The EAA, like its predecessors, contained a sunset provision, and, beginning in the mid-1980s, Congress let the EAA lapse several times. Each time, the President kept controls on exports in force by declaring an emergency under the National Emergencies Act and invoking authorities under the International Emergency Economic Powers Act (IEEPA).

The Act was mostly repealed by the Export Control Reform Act of 2018. That law provided a statutory basis for the Export Administration Regulations (EAR) and did not include any sunset provisions. However, "because the implementation of certain sanctions authorities, including sections 11A, 11B, and 11C of the Export Administration Act ... is to be carried out under the International Emergency Economic Powers Act," the president must continue to use IEEPA to maintain the national emergency under which those sanctions were implemented.

== Regulation forbidding Anti-Israel boycotts ==
The U.S. Department of Commerce's Bureau of Industry and Security is charged with enforcing and administering anti-boycott laws (largely anti-BDS laws) under the Export Administration Act.

"Those laws discourage, and in some circumstances, prohibit U.S. companies from furthering or supporting the boycott of Israel sponsored by the Arab League, and certain Muslim countries, including complying with certain requests for information designed to verify compliance with the boycott."

== See also ==
- Export Administration Regulations (EAR)
- International Traffic in Arms Regulations (ITAR)
- Boycott, Divestment and Sanctions
