= Nuclear Non-Proliferation Act of 1978 =

- Other short titles: Nuclear Antiproliferation Act
- Long title: An Act to provide for more efficient and effective control over the proliferation of nuclear explosive capability.
- Acronyms (colloquial): NNPA, NAPA
- Enacted by: the 95th United States Congress
- Effective: March 10, 1978

Citations
- Public law: 95-242
- Statutes at Large: 92 Stat. 120

Codification
- Titles amended: 22 U.S.C.: Foreign Relations and Intercourse
- U.S.C. sections created: 22 U.S.C. ch. 47 § 3201 et seq.

Legislative history
- Introduced in the House as H.R. 8638 by Jonathan Brewster Bingham (D–NY) on July 29, 1977; Committee consideration by House International Relations, Senate Foreign Relations; Passed the House on September 28, 1977 (411–0); Passed the Senate on February 7, 1978 (88–3, in lieu of S. 897) with amendment; House agreed to Senate amendment on February 9, 1978 (passed/agreed); Signed into law by President Jimmy Carter on March 10, 1978

Nuclear Non-Proliferation Act of 1978, 22 U.S.C. § 3201, is a United States federal law declaring that nuclear explosive devices pose a perilous threat to the security interests of the United States. The law restricts U.S. export of civil nuclear programs to other nations.

The H.R. 8638 legislation was passed by the 95th United States Congress and signed into law by the 39th President of the United States Jimmy Carter on March 10, 1978.

== Provisions of the Act ==
The Nuclear Non-Proliferation Act provided several policy elements for the control and limitations of nuclear technology.

- United States is to pursue the fuel supply assurances with developing nations through international initiatives. The establishment of more effective international controls over the transfer and use of nuclear materials, equipment, and nuclear technology for peaceful purposes to prevent proliferation, including the establishment of common international sanctions.
- United States is to take such actions as required to confirm the reliability of the nation meeting its commitments to supply nuclear reactors and fuel to nations which adhere to effective non-proliferation policies by establishing procedures to facilitate the timely processing of requests for subsequent arrangements and export licenses.
- The Nuclear Non-Proliferation Act strongly encourages nations, which have not ratified the Treaty on the Non-Proliferation of Nuclear Weapons, to do so at the earliest possible date.
- United States is to cooperate with foreign nations in identifying and adapting suitable technologies for energy production and, in particular, to identify alternative options to nuclear power in aiding such nations to meet their energy needs, consistent with the economic and material resources of those nations and environmental protection.

== Titles of the Act ==
=== Definitions ===
(a) As used in this Act, the term —

(1) "Commission" means the Nuclear Regulatory Commission
(2) "Director" means the Director of the Arms Control and Disarmament Agency; Replaced in 1999 by US Department of State Hence "DIRECTOR" = "SECRETARY OF STATE" post 1999;
(3) "IAEA" means International Atomic Energy Agency
(4) "nuclear materials and equipment" means source material, special nuclear material, production facilities, utilization facilities, and components, items or substances determined to have significance for nuclear explosive purposes pursuant of the Atomic Energy Act of 1954
(5) "physical security measures" means measures to reasonably ensure that source or special nuclear material available only be used for authorized purposes and to prevent theft and sabotage
(6) "sensitive nuclear technology" means any information (including information incorporated in a production or utilization facility or important component part thereof) which is not available to the public and which is important to the design, construction, fabrication, operation or maintenance of a uranium enrichment or nuclear fuel reprocessing facility or a facility for the production of heavy water, but shall not include Restricted Data controlled pursuant of the 1954 Act
(7) "1954 Act" means the Atomic Energy Act of 1954, as amended
(8) "the Treaty" means the Treaty on the Non-Proliferation of Nuclear Weapons

(b) All other terms used in this Act not defined in this section shall have the meanings ascribed to them by the 1954 Act, the Energy Reorganization Act of 1974, and the Treaty.

=== Title I – United States Initiatives to Provide Adequate Nuclear Fuel Supply ===
==== Policy ====
The United States, as a matter of national policy, shall take such actions and institute such measures as may be necessary and feasible to assure other nations and groups of nations that may seek to utilize the benefits of atomic energy for peaceful purposes that it will provide a reliable supply of nuclear fuel to those nations and groups of nations which adhere to policies designed to prevent proliferation . Such nuclear fuel shall be provided under agreements entered into pursuant of the 1954 Act or as otherwise authorized by law. The United States shall ensure that it will have available the capacity on a long-term basis to enter into new fuel supply commitments consistent with its non-proliferation policies and domestic energy needs. The Commission shall, on a timely basis, authorize the export of nuclear materials and equipment when all the applicable statutory requirements are met.

==== Uranium Enrichment Capacity ====
Secretary of Energy is directed to initiate construction planning and design, construction, and operation activities for expansion of uranium enrichment capacity, as elsewhere provided by law. Further the Secretary as well as the Nuclear Regulatory Commission, the Secretary of State, and the Director of the Arms Control and Disarmament Agency are directed to establish and implement procedures which will ensure to the maximum extent feasible, consistent with this Act, orderly processing of subsequent arrangements and export licenses with minimum time delay.

==== Report ====
The President shall promptly undertake a study to determine the need for additional United States enrichment capacity to meet domestic and foreign needs and to promote United States non-proliferation objectives abroad. The President shall report to the Congress on the results of this study within twelve months after the date of enactment of this Act.

==== International Undertakings ====
(a) Consistent with this Act, the President shall institute prompt discussions with other nations and groups of nations, including both supplier and recipient nations, to develop international approaches for meeting future worldwide nuclear fuel needs. In particular, the President is authorized and urged to seek to negotiate as soon as practicable with nations possessing nuclear fuel production facilities or source material, and such other nations and groups of nations, such as the International Atomic Energy Agency, as may be deemed appropriate, with a view toward the timely establishment of binding international undertakings providing for —
(b) The President shall submit to Congress not later than six months after the date of enactment of this Act proposals for initial fuel assurances, including creation of an interim stockpile of uranium enriched to less than 20 percent in the uranium isotope 235 (low enriched uranium) to be available for transfer pursuant to a sales arrangement to nations which adhere to strict policies designed to prevent proliferation when and if necessary to ensure continuity of nuclear fuel supply to such nations. Such submission shall include proposals for the transfer of low-enriched uranium up to an amount sufficient to produce 100,000 MWe years of power from light water nuclear reactors, and shall also include proposals for seeking contributions from other supplier nations to such an interim stockpile pending the establishment of INFA.
(c) The President shall address in the report the desirability of and options for foreign participation, including investment, in new United States uranium enrichment facilities. This report shall also address the arrangements that would be required to implement such participation and the commitments that would be required as a condition of such participation. This report shall be accompanied by any proposed legislation to implement these arrangements.
(d) The fuel assurances contemplated by this section shall be for the benefit of nations that adhere to policies designed to prevent proliferation. In negotiating the binding international undertakings called for in this section, the President shall, in particular, seek to ensure that the benefits of such undertakings are available to non-nuclear weapon states only if such states accept IAEA safeguards on all their peaceful nuclear activities, do not manufacture or otherwise acquire any nuclear explosive device, do not establish any new enrichment or reprocessing facilities under their de facto or de jure control, and place any such existing facilities under effective international auspices and inspection.
(e) The report required shall include information on the progress made in any negotiations pursuant to this section.
(f) The President may not enter into any binding international undertaking negotiated pursuant to

(a) which is not a treaty until such time as such proposed undertaking has been submitted to the Congress and has been approved by concurrent resolution.
(b) shall be submitted to the Congress as part of an annual authorization Act for the Department of Energy.

==== Reevaluation of Nuclear Fuel Cycle ====
The President shall take immediate initiatives to invite all nuclear supplier and recipient nations to reevaluate all aspects of the nuclear fuel cycle, with emphasis on alternatives to an economy based on the separation of pure plutonium or the presence of high enriched uranium, methods to deal with spent fuel storage, and methods to improve the safeguards for existing nuclear technology. The President shall, in the first report required, detail the progress of such international reevaluation.

=== Title II – United States Initiatives to Strengthen the International Safeguards System ===
==== Policy ====
The United States is committed to continued strong support for the principles of the Treaty on the Non-Proliferation of Nuclear Weapons, to a strengthened and more effective International Atomic Energy Agency and to a comprehensive safeguards system administered by the Agency to deter proliferation. Accordingly, the United States shall seek to act with other nations to —

(a) continue to strengthen the safeguards program of the IAEA and, in order to implement this section, contribute funds, technical resources, and other support to assist the IAEA in effectively implementing safeguards
(b) ensure that the IAEA has the resources to carry out the provisions of Article XII of the Statute of the IAEA
(c) improve the IAEA safeguards system (including accountability) to ensure —

(1) the timely detection of a possible diversion of source or special nuclear materials which could be used for nuclear explosive devices
(2) the timely dissemination of information regarding such diversion
(3) the timely implementation of internationally agreed procedures in the event of such diversion

(d ) ensure that the IAEA receives on a timely basis the data needed for it to administer an effective and comprehensive international safeguards program and that the IAEA provides timely notice to the world community of any evidence of a violation of any safeguards agreement to which it is a party
(e) encourage the IAEA, to the maximum degree consistent with the Statute, to provide nations which supply nuclear materials and equipment with the data needed to assure such nations of adherence to bilateral commitments applicable to such supply.

==== Training Program ====
The Department of Energy, in consultation with the Commission, shall establish and operate a safeguards and physical security training program to be made available to persons from nations and groups of nations which have developed or acquired, or may be expected to develop or acquire, nuclear materials and equipment for use for peaceful purposes. Any such program shall include training in the most advanced safeguards and physical security techniques and technology, consistent with the national security interests of the United States.

==== Negotiations ====
The United States shall seek to negotiate with other nations and groups of nations to —

(1) adopt general principles and procedures, including common international sanctions, to be followed in the event that a nation violates any material obligation with respect to the peaceful use of nuclear materials and equipment or nuclear technology, or in the event that any nation violates the principles of the Treaty, including the detonation by a non-nuclear weapon state of a nuclear explosive device
(2) establish international procedures to be followed in the event of diversion, sabotage, or theft of nuclear materials or sabotage of nuclear facilities, and for recovering nuclear materials that have been lost or stolen, or obtained or used by a nation or by any person or group in contravention of the principles of the Treaty.

=== Title III – Export Organization and Criteria ===
==== Government-to-Government Transfers ====
(a) The authority to distribute special nuclear material under this section other than under an export license granted by the Nuclear Regulatory Commission shall extend only to the following small quantities of special nuclear material (in no event more than 500 grams (18 oz) per year of the uranium isotope 233, the uranium isotope 235, or plutonium contained in special nuclear material to any recipient).

(1) which are contained in laboratory samples, medical devices, or monitoring or other instruments
(2) the distribution of which is needed to deal with an emergency situation in which time is of the essence

(b) The authority to distribute source material under this section other than under an export license granted by the Nuclear Regulatory Commission shall in no case extend to quantities of source material in excess of 3 metric tons (6,600 lb) per year per recipient.
(c) The Nuclear Regulatory Commission is authorized to license the distribution of special nuclear material, source material, and byproduct material by the Department of Energy pursuant of this Act, respectively, in accordance with the same procedures established by law for the export licensing of such material by any person : Provided, That nothing in this section shall require the licensing of the distribution of byproduct material by the Department of Energy under this Act.
The Department of Energy shall not distribute any special nuclear material or source material under this Act other than under an export license issued by the Nuclear Regulatory Commission until —

(1) the Department has obtained the concurrence of the Department of State and has consulted with the Arms Control and Disarmament Agency, the Nuclear Regulatory Commission, and the Department of Defense under mutually agreed procedures which shall be established within not more than ninety days after the date of enactment of this provision
(2) the Department finds based on a reasonable judgment of the assurances provided and the information available to the United States Government, that the criteria in this Act or their equivalent and any applicable criteria are met, and that the proposed distribution would not be inimical to the common defense and security.

==== Subsequent Arrangements ====
(1) Prior to entering into any proposed subsequent arrangement under an agreement for cooperation (other than an agreement for cooperation arranged pursuant of this Act), the Secretary of Energy shall obtain the concurrence of the Secretary of State and shall consult with the Director, the Commission, and the Secretary of Defense : Provided, That the Secretary of State shall have the leading role in any negotiations of a policy nature pertaining to any proposed subsequent arrangement regarding arrangements for the storage or disposition of irradiated fuel elements or approvals for the transfer, for which prior approval is required under an agreement for cooperation, by a recipient of source or special nuclear material, production or utilization facilities, or nuclear technology. Notice of any proposed subsequent arrangement shall be published in the Federal Register, together with the written determination of the Secretary of Energy that such arrangement will not be inimical to the common defense and security, and such proposed subsequent arrangement shall not take effect before fifteen days after publication. Whenever the Director declares that the intention is to prepare a Nuclear Proliferation Assessment Statement pursuant of this subsection, notice of the proposed subsequent arrangement which is the subject of the Director's declaration shall not be published until after the receipt by the Secretary of Energy of such Statement or the expiration of the time authorized for the preparation of such Statement, whichever occurs first.
(2) If in the Director's view a proposed subsequent arrangement might significantly contribute to proliferation, the Director may prepare an unclassified Nuclear Proliferation Assessment Statement with regard to such proposed subsequent arrangement regarding the adequacy of the safeguards and other control mechanisms and the application of the peaceful use assurances of the relevant agreement to ensure that assistance to be furnished pursuant to the subsequent arrangement will not be used to further any military or nuclear explosive purpose. For the purposes of this section, the term 'subsequent arrangements' means arrangements entered into by any agency or department of the United States Government with respect to cooperation with any nation or group of nations (but not purely private or domestic arrangements) involving —

(A) contracts for the furnishing of nuclear materials and equipment
(B) approvals for the transfer, for which prior approval is required under an agreement for cooperation, by a recipient of any source or special nuclear material, production or utilization facility, or nuclear technology
(C) authorization for the distribution of nuclear materials and equipment pursuant to this Act which is not subject to the procedures set forth
(D) arrangements for physical security
(E) arrangements for the storage or disposition of irradiated fuel elements
(F) arrangements for the application of safeguards with respect to nuclear materials and equipment
(G) any other arrangement which the President finds to be important from the standpoint of preventing proliferation

==== Export Licensing Procedures ====
No license may be issued by the Nuclear Regulatory Commission (the 'Commission') for the export of any production or utilization facility, or any source material or special nuclear material, including distributions of any material by the Department of Energy for which a license is required or requested, and no exemption from any requirement for such an export license may be granted by the Commission, as the case may be, until —

(1) the Commission has been notified by the Secretary of State that it is the judgment of the executive branch that the proposed export or exemption will not be inimical to the common defense and security, or that any export in the category to which the proposed export belongs would not be inimical to the common defense and security because it lacks significance for nuclear explosive purposes. The Secretary of State shall, within ninety days after the enactment of this section, establish orderly and expeditious procedures, including provision for necessary administrative actions and inter-agency memorandum of understanding, which are mutually agreeable to the Secretaries of Energy, Defense, and Commerce, the Director of the Arms Control and Disarmament Agency, and the Nuclear Regulatory Commission for the preparation of the executive branch judgment on export applications under this section. Such procedures shall include, at a minimum, explicit direction on the handling of such applications, express deadlines for the solicitation and collection of the views of the consulted agencies (with identified officials responsible for meeting such deadlines), an inter-agency coordinating authority to monitor the processing of such applications, predetermined procedures for the expeditious handling of intra-agency and inter-agency disagreements and appeals to higher authorities, frequent meetings of inter-agency administrative coordinators to review the status of all pending applications, and similar administrative mechanisms. To the extent practicable, an applicant should be advised of all the information required of the applicant for the entire process for every agency's needs at the beginning of the process. Potentially controversial applications should be identified as quickly as possible so that any required policy decisions or diplomatic consultations can be initiated in a timely manner. An immediate effort should be undertaken to establish quickly any necessary standards and criteria, including the nature of any required assurances or evidentiary showings, for the decisions required under this section. The processing of any export application proposed and filed as of the date of enactment of this section shall not be delayed pending the development and establishment of procedures to implement the requirements of this section. The executive branch judgment shall be completed in not more than sixty days from receipt of the application or request, unless the Secretary of State in his discretion specifically authorizes additional time for consideration of the application or request because it is in the national interest to allow such additional time. The Secretary shall notify the Committee on Foreign Relations of the Senate and the Committee on International Relations of the House of Representatives of any such authorization. In submitting any such judgment, the Secretary of State shall specifically address the extent to which the export criteria then in effect are met and the extent to which the cooperating party has adhered to the provisions of the applicable agreement for cooperation. In the event he considers it warranted, the Secretary may also address the following additional factors, among others :

(A) whether issuing the license or granting the exemption will materially advance the non-proliferation policy of the United States by encouraging the recipient nation to adhere to the Treaty, or to participate in the undertakings contemplated by the Nuclear Non-Proliferation Act of 1978
(B) whether failure to issue the license or grant the exemption would otherwise be seriously prejudicial to the non-proliferation objectives of the United States
(C) whether the recipient nation or group of nations has agreed that conditions substantially identical to the export criteria set forth in this Act will be applied by another nuclear supplier nation or group of nations to the proposed United States export, and whether in the Secretary' s judgment those conditions will be implemented in a manner acceptable to the United States.

The Secretary of State shall provide appropriate data and recommendations, subject to requests for additional data and recommendations, as required by the Commission or the Secretary of Energy, as the case may be.

==== Criteria Governing United States Nuclear Exports ====
The United States adopts the following criteria which, in addition to other requirements of law, will govern exports for peaceful nuclear uses from the United States of source material, special nuclear material, production or utilization facilities, and any sensitive nuclear technology :

(1) IAEA safeguards as required by Article III of the Treaty will be applied with respect to any such material or facilities proposed to be exported, to any such material or facilities; previously exported and subject to the applicable agreement for cooperation, and to any special nuclear material used in or produced through the use thereof.
(2) No such material, facilities, or sensitive nuclear technology proposed to be exported or previously exported and subject to the applicable agreement for cooperation, and no special nuclear material produced through the use of such materials, facilities, or sensitive nuclear technology, will be used for any nuclear explosive device or for research on or development of any nuclear explosive device.
(3) Adequate physical security measures will be maintained with respect to such material or facilities proposed to be exported and to any special nuclear material used in or produced through the use thereof. Following the effective date of any regulations promulgated by the Commission pursuant to the Nuclear Non-Proliferation Act of 1978, physical security measures shall be deemed adequate if such measures provide a level of protection equivalent to that required by the applicable regulations.
(4) No such materials, facilities, or sensitive nuclear technology proposed to be exported, and no special nuclear material produced through the use of such material, will be retransferred to the jurisdiction of any other nation or group of nations unless the prior approval of the United States is obtained for such retransfer. In addition to other requirements of law, the United States may approve such retransfer only if the nation or group of nations designated to receive such retransfer agrees that it shall be subject to the conditions required by this section.
(5) No such material proposed to be exported and no special nuclear material produced through the use of such material will be reprocessed, and no irradiated fuel elements containing such material removed from a reactor shall be altered in form or content, unless the prior approval of the United States is obtained for such reprocessing or alteration.
(6) No such sensitive nuclear technology shall be exported unless the foregoing conditions shall be applied to any nuclear material or equipment which is produced or constructed under the jurisdiction of the recipient nation or group of nations by or through the use of any such exported sensitive nuclear technology.

==== Additional Export Criterion and Procedures ====
(1) As a condition of continued United States export of source material, special nuclear material, production or utilization facilities, and any sensitive nuclear technology to non-nuclear weapon states, no such export shall be made unless IAEA safeguards are maintained with respect to all peaceful nuclear activities in, under the jurisdiction of, or carried out under the control of such state at the time of the export.
(2) The President shall seek to achieve adherence to the foregoing criterion by recipient non-nuclear weapon states. The criterion set forth shall be applied as an export criterion with respect to any application for the export of materials, facilities, or technology specified in which is filed after eighteen months from the date of enactment of this section, or for any such application under which the first export would occur at least twenty-four months after the date of enactment of this section.

==== Conduct Resulting in Termination of Nuclear Exports ====
No nuclear materials and equipment or sensitive nuclear technology shall be exported to —

(1) Any non-nuclear weapon state that is found by the President to have, at any time after the effective date of this section,

(A) Detonated a nuclear explosive device
(B) Terminated or abrogated IAEA safeguards
(C) Materially violated an IAEA safeguards agreement
(D) Engaged in activities involving source or special nuclear material and having direct significance for the manufacture or acquisition of nuclear explosive devices, and has failed to take steps which, in the President's judgment, represent sufficient progress toward terminating such activities

(2) Any nation or group of nations that is found by the President to have, at any time after the effective date of this section,

(A) Materially violated an agreement for cooperation with the United States, or, with respect to material or equipment not supplied under an agreement for cooperation, materially violated the terms under which such material or equipment was supplied or the terms of any commitments obtained with respect thereto pursuant to the Nuclear Non-Proliferation Act of 1978
(B) Assisted, encouraged, or induced any non-nuclear weapon state to engage in activities involving source or special nuclear material and having direct significance for the manufacture or acquisition of nuclear explosive devices, and has failed to take steps which, in the President's judgment, represent sufficient progress toward terminating such assistance, encouragement, or inducement
(C) Entered into an agreement after the date of enactment of this section for the transfer of reprocessing equipment, materials, or technology to the sovereign control of a non-nuclear weapon state except in connection with an international fuel cycle evaluation in which the United States is a participant or pursuant to a subsequent international agreement or understanding to which the United States subscribes

==== Congressional Review Procedures ====
Not later than forty-five days of continuous session of Congress after the date of transmittal to the Congress of any submission of the President required by this Act, the Committee on Foreign Relations of the Senate and the Committee on International Relations of the House of Representatives, and in addition, in the case of a proposed agreement for cooperation arranged the Committee on Armed Services of the House of Representatives and the Committee on Armed Services of the Senate, shall each submit a report to its respective House on its views and recommendations respecting such Presidential submission together with a resolution, stating in substance that the Congress approves or disapproves such submission, as the case may be : Provided, That if any such committee has not reported such a resolution at the end of a forty-five-day period, such committee shall be deemed to be discharged from further consideration of such submission and if, in the case of a proposed agreement for cooperation arranged pursuant of this Act, the other relevant committee of that House has reported such a resolution, such committee shall be deemed discharged from further consideration of that resolution. If no such resolution has been reported at the end of such period, the first resolution, which is introduced within five days thereafter within such House shall be placed on the appropriate calendar of such House.

==== Component and Other Parts of Facilities ====
With respect to those utilization and production facilities which are so determined by the Commission pursuant to Nuclear Non-Proliferation Act of 1978, the Commission may issue general licenses for domestic activities required to be licensed by this Act, if the Commission determines in writing that such general licensing will not constitute an unreasonable risk to the common defense and security. After consulting with the Secretaries of State, Energy, and Commerce and the Director, the Commission is authorized and directed to determine which component parts and which other items or substances are especially relevant from the standpoint of export control because of their significance for nuclear explosive purposes.

=== Title IV – Negotiation of Further Export Controls ===
==== Cooperation with Other Nations ====
No cooperation with any nation, group of nations or regional defense organization shall be undertaken until —

The proposed agreement for cooperation has been submitted to the President, which proposed agreement shall include the terms, conditions, duration, nature, and scope of the cooperation; and shall include the following requirements :

(1) A guaranty by the cooperating party that safeguards as set forth in the agreement for cooperation will be maintained with respect to all nuclear materials and equipment transferred pursuant thereto, and with respect to all special nuclear material used in or produced through the use of such nuclear materials and equipment, so long as the material or equipment remains under the jurisdiction or control of the cooperating party, irrespective of the duration of other provisions in the agreement or whether the agreement is terminated or suspended for any reason
(2) In the case of non-nuclear weapon states, a requirement, as a condition of continued United States nuclear supply under the agreement for cooperation, that IAEA safeguards be maintained with respect to all nuclear materials in all peaceful nuclear activities within the territory of such state, under its jurisdiction, or carried out under its control anywhere
(3) Except in the case of those agreements for cooperation, a guaranty by the cooperating party that no nuclear materials and equipment or sensitive nuclear technology to be transferred pursuant to such agreement, and no special nuclear material produced through the use of any nuclear materials and equipment or sensitive nuclear technology transferred pursuant to such agreement, will be used for any nuclear explosive device, or for research on or development of any nuclear explosive device, or for any other military purpose
(4) Except in the case of those agreements for cooperation arranged pursuant this Act and agreements for cooperation with nuclear weapon states, a stipulation that the United States shall have the right to require the return of any nuclear materials and equipment transferred pursuant thereto and any special nuclear material produced through the use thereof if the cooperating party detonates a nuclear explosive device or terminates or abrogates an agreement providing for IAEA safeguards
(5) A guaranty by the cooperating party that any material or any Restricted Data transferred pursuant to the agreement for cooperation and, except in the case of agreements arranged pursuant this Act, production or utilization facility transferred pursuant to the agreement for cooperation or any special nuclear material produced through the use of any such facility or through the use of any material transferred pursuant to the agreement, will not be transferred to unauthorized persons or beyond the jurisdiction or control of the cooperating party without the consent of the United States
(6) A guaranty by the cooperating party that adequate physical security will be maintained with respect to any nuclear material transferred pursuant to such agreement and with respect to any special nuclear material used in or produced through the use of any material, production facility, or utilization facility transferred pursuant to such agreement
(7) Except in the case of agreements for cooperation arranged pursuant this Act, a guaranty by the cooperating party that no material transferred pursuant to the agreement for cooperation and no material used in or produced through the use of any material, production facility, or utilization facility transferred pursuant to the agreement for cooperation will be reprocessed, enriched or (in the case of plutonium, uranium-233, or uranium enriched to greater than twenty percent in the isotope 235, or other nuclear materials which have been irradiated) otherwise altered in form or content without the prior approval of the United States
(8) Except in the case of agreements for cooperation arranged pursuant this Act, a guaranty by the cooperating party that no plutonium, no uranium-233, and no uranium enriched to greater than twenty percent in the isotope 235, transferred pursuant to the agreement for cooperation, or recovered from any source or special nuclear material so transferred or from any source or special nuclear material used in any production facility or utilization facility transferred pursuant to the agreement for cooperation, will be stored in any facility that has not been approved in advance by the United States
(9) Except in the case of agreements for cooperation arranged pursuant this Act, a guaranty by the cooperating party that any special nuclear material, production facility, or utilization facility produced or constructed under the jurisdiction of the cooperating party by or through the use of any sensitive nuclear technology transferred pursuant to such agreement for cooperation will be subject to all the requirements specified in this subsection

==== Additional Requirements ====
Except as specifically provided in any agreement for cooperation, no source or special nuclear material hereafter exported from the United States may be enriched after export without the prior approval of the United States for such enrichment : Provided, That the procedures governing such approvals shall be identical to those set forth for the approval of proposed subsequent arrangements under the 1954 Act, and any commitments from the recipient which the Secretary of Energy and the Secretary of State deem necessary to ensure that such approval will be obtained prior to such enrichment shall be obtained prior to the submission of the executive branch judgment regarding the export in question and shall be set forth in such submission : And provided further, That no source or special nuclear material shall be exported for the purpose of enrichment or reactor fueling to any nation or group of nations which has, after the date of enactment of this Act, entered into a new or amended agreement for cooperation with the United States, except pursuant to such agreement.

==== Peaceful Nuclear Activities ====
The President shall take immediate and vigorous steps to seek agreement from all nations and groups of nations to commit themselves to adhere to the following export policies with respect to their peaceful nuclear activities and their participation in international nuclear trade :

(a) No nuclear materials and equipment and no sensitive nuclear technology within the territory of any nation or group of nations, under its jurisdiction, or under its control anywhere will be transferred to the jurisdiction of any other nation or group of nations unless the nation or group of nations receiving such transfer commits itself to strict undertakings including, but not limited to, provisions sufficient to ensure that —

(1) No nuclear materials and equipment and no nuclear technology in, under the jurisdiction of, or under the control of any non-nuclear weapon state, shall be used for nuclear explosive devices for any purpose or for research on or development of nuclear explosive devices for any purpose, except as permitted by Article V, the Treaty
(2) IAEA safeguards will be applied to all peaceful nuclear activities in, under the jurisdiction of, or under the control of any non-nuclear weapon state
(3) Adequate physical security measures will be established and maintained or any nation or group of nations on all of its nuclear activities
(4) No nuclear materials and equipment and no nuclear technology intended for peaceful purposes in, under the jurisdiction of, or under the control of any nation or group of nations shall be transferred to the jurisdiction of any other nation or group of nations which does not agree to stringent undertakings meeting the objectives of this section
(5) No nation or group of nations will assist, encourage, or induce any non-nuclear weapon state to manufacture or otherwise acquire any nuclear explosive device

(b) Enriched nuclear material, sources, prohibition, and proposed international agreements

(1) No source or special nuclear material within the territory of any nation or group of nations, under its jurisdiction, or under its control anywhere will be enriched. Of the 1954 Act or reprocessed, no irradiated fuel elements containing such material which are to be removed from a reactor will be altered in form or content, and no fabrication or stockpiling involving plutonium, uranium-233, or uranium enriched to greater than 20 percent in the isotope 235 shall be performed except in a facility under effective international auspices and inspection, and any such irradiated fuel elements shall be transferred to such a facility as soon as practicable after removal from a reactor consistent with safety requirements. Such facilities shall be limited in number to the greatest extent feasible and shall be carefully sited and managed so as to minimize the proliferation and environmental risks associated with such facilities. In addition, there shall be conditions to limit the access of non-nuclear weapon states other than the host country to sensitive nuclear technology associated with such facilities.
(2) Any facilities within the territory of any nation or group of nations, under its jurisdiction, or under its control anywhere for the necessary short-term storage of fuel elements containing plutonium, uranium-233, or uranium enriched to greater than 20 percent in the isotope 235 prior to placement in a reactor or of irradiated fuel elements prior to transfer as required in this Act shall be placed under effective international auspices and inspection.

(c) Adequate physical security measures will be established and maintained with respect to all nuclear activities within the territory of each nation and group of nations, under its jurisdiction, or under its control anywhere, and with respect to any international shipment of significant quantities of source or special nuclear material or irradiated source or special nuclear material, which shall also be conducted under international safeguards.
(d) Nothing in this section shall be interpreted to require international control or supervision of any United States military activities.

==== Renegotiation of Agreements for Cooperation ====
(a) The President shall initiate a program immediately to renegotiate agreements for cooperation in effect on the date of enactment of this Act, or otherwise to obtain the agreement of parties to such agreements for cooperation to the undertakings that would be required for new agreements under the 1954 Act. To the extent that an agreement for cooperation in effect on the date of enactment of this Act with a cooperating party contains provisions equivalent to any or all of the criteria set forth in the 1954 Act with respect to materials and equipment transferred pursuant thereto or with respect to any special nuclear material used in or produced through the use of any such material or equipment, any renegotiated agreement with that cooperating party shall continue to contain an equivalent provision with respect to such transferred materials and equipment and such special nuclear material. To the extent that an agreement for cooperation in effect on the date of enactment of this Act with a cooperating party does not contain provisions with respect to any nuclear materials and equipment which have previously been transferred under an agreement for cooperation with the United States and which are under the jurisdiction or control of the cooperating party and with respect to any special nuclear material which is used in or produced through the use thereof and which is under the jurisdiction or control of the cooperating party, which are equivalent to any or all of those required for new and amended agreements for cooperation under the 1954 Act, the President shall vigorously seek to obtain the application of such provisions with respect to such nuclear materials and equipment and such special nuclear material. Nothing in this Act or in the 1954 Act shall be deemed to relinquish any rights which the United States may have under any agreement for cooperation in force on the date of enactment of this Act.
(b) The President shall annually review each of requirements set forth for inclusion in agreements for cooperation under the 1954 Act and the export policy goals set forth to determine whether it is in the interest of United States non-proliferation objectives for any such requirements or export policies which are not already being applied as export criteria to be enacted as additional export criteria.
(c) If the President proposes enactment of any such requirements or export policies as additional export criteria or to take any other action with respect to such requirements or export policy goals for the purpose of encouraging adherence by nations and groups of nations to such requirements and policies, he shall submit such a proposal together with an explanation thereof to the U.S. Congress.
(d) If the Committee e on Foreign Relations of the Senate or the Committee on International Relations of the House of Representatives, after reviewing the President's annual report or any proposed legislation, determines that it is in the interest of United States non-proliferation objectives to take any action with respect to such requirements or export policy goals, it shall report a joint resolution to implement such determination. Any joint resolution so reported shall be considered in the Senate and the House of Representatives, respectively, under applicable procedures provided for the consideration of resolutions pursuant to the 1954 Act.

==== Authority to Continue Agreements ====
(a) The amendments to the 1954 Act made by this Act shall not affect the authority to continue cooperation pursuant to agreements for cooperation entered into prior to the date of enactment of this Act.
(b) Nothing in this Act shall affect the authority to include dispute settlement provisions, including arbitration, in any agreement made pursuant to an Agreement for Cooperation.

==== Review ====
No court or regulatory body shall have any jurisdiction under any law to compel the performance of or to review the adequacy of the performance of any Nuclear Proliferation Assessment Statement called for in this Act or in the 1954 Act.

==== Protection of the Environment ====
The President shall endeavor to provide in any agreement entered into pursuant of the 1954 Act for cooperation between the parties in protecting the international environment from radioactive, chemical or thermal contamination arising from peaceful nuclear activities.

=== Title V – United States Assistance to Developing Countries ===
==== Policy and Report ====
The United States shall endeavor to cooperate with other nations, international institutions, and private organizations in establishing programs to assist in the development of non-nuclear energy resources, to cooperate with both developing and industrialized nations in protecting the international environment from contamination arising from both nuclear and non-nuclear energy activities, and shall seek to cooperate with and aid developing countries in meeting their energy needs through the development of such resources and the application of non-nuclear technologies consistent with the economic factors, the material resources of those countries, and environmental protection. The United States shall additionally seek to encourage other industrialized nations and groups of nations to make commitments for similar cooperation and aid to developing countries. The President shall report annually to Congress on the level of other nations' and groups of nations' commitments under such program and the relation of any such commitments to United States efforts under this title. In cooperating with and providing such assistance to developing countries, the United States shall give priority to parties to the Treaty.

==== Programs ====
(a) The United States shall initiate a program, consistent with the aims to cooperate with developing countries for the purpose of —

(1) Meeting the energy needs required for the development of such countries
(2) Reducing the dependence of such countries on petroleum fuels, with emphasis given to utilizing solar and other renewable energy resources
(3) Expanding the energy alternatives available to such countries

(b) Such program shall include cooperation in evaluating the energy alternatives of developing countries, facilitating international trade in energy commodities, developing energy resources, and applying suitable energy technologies. The program shall include both general and country specific energy assessments and cooperative projects in resource exploration and production, training, research and development.
(c) As an integral part of such program, the Department of Energy, under the general policy guidance of the Department of State and in cooperation with the Agency for International Development and other Federal agencies as appropriate, shall initiate, as soon as practicable, a program for the exchange of United States scientists, technicians, and energy experts with those of developing countries to implement the purposes of this Act.
(d) For the purposes of carrying out this Act, there is authorized to be appropriated such sums as are contained in annual authorization Acts for the Department of Energy, including such sums which have been authorized for such purposes under previous legislation.
(e) Under the direction of the President, the Secretary of State shall ensure the coordination of the activities authorized by this title with other related activities of the United States conducted abroad, including the programs authorized by the Foreign Assistance Act of 1961.

==== Report ====
Not later than twelve months after the date of enactment of this Act, the President shall report to the U.S. Congress on the feasibility of expanding the cooperative activities established into an international cooperative effort to include a scientific peace corps designed to encourage large numbers of technically trained volunteers to live and work in developing countries for varying periods of time for the purpose of engaging in projects to aid in meeting the energy needs of such countries through the search for and utilization of indigenous energy resources and the application of suitable technology, including the widespread utilization of renewable and unconventional energy technologies. Such report shall also include a discussion of other mechanisms to conduct a coordinated international effort to develop, demonstrate, and encourage the utilization of such technologies in developing countries.

=== Title VI – Executive Reporting ===
==== Reports of the President ====
(a) The President shall review all activities of Government departments and agencies relating to preventing proliferation and shall make a report to U.S. Congress in January of 1979 and annually in January of each year thereafter on the Government's efforts to prevent proliferation. This report shall include but not be limited to —

(1) A description of the progress made toward —

(A) Negotiating the initiatives contemplated in this Act
(B) Negotiating the international arrangements or other mutual undertakings contemplated in this Act
(C) Encouraging non-nuclear weapon states that are not party to the Treaty to adhere to the Treaty or, pending such adherence, to enter into comparable agreements with respect to safeguards and to forswear the development of any nuclear explosive devices, and discouraging nuclear exports to non-nuclear weapon states which have not taken such steps
(D) Strengthening the safeguards of the IAEA as contemplated in this Act
(E) Renegotiating agreements for cooperation as contemplated in this Act

(2) An assessment of the impact of the progress on the non-proliferation policy of the United States; an explanation of the precise reasons why progress has not been made on any particular point and recommendations with respect to appropriate measures to encourage progress; and a statement of what legislative modifications, if any, are necessary in his judgment to achieve the non-proliferation policy of the United States
(3) A determination as to which non-nuclear weapon states with which the United States has an agreement for cooperation in effect or under negotiation, if any, have —

(A) Detonated a nuclear device
(B) Refused to accept the safeguards of the IAEA on all of their peaceful nuclear activities
(C) Refused to give specific assurances that they will not manufacture or otherwise acquire any nuclear explosive device
(D) Engaged in activities involving source or special nuclear material and having direct significance for the manufacture or acquisition of nuclear explosive devices

(4) An assessment of whether any of the policies set forth in this Act have, on balance, been counterproductive from the standpoint of preventing proliferation
(5) A description of the progress made toward establishing procedures to facilitate the timely processing of requests for subsequent arrangements and export licenses in order to enhance the reliability of the United States in meeting its commitments to supply nuclear reactors and fuel to nations which adhere to effective non-proliferation policies .

(b) In the first report required by this section, the President shall analyze each civil agreement for cooperation negotiated pursuant of the 1954 Act, and shall discuss the scope and adequacy of the requirements and obligations relating to safeguards and other controls therein.

==== Additional Reports ====
(a) The annual reports to the U.S. Congress by the Commission and the Department of Energy which are otherwise required by law shall also include views and recommendations regarding the policies and actions of the United States to prevent proliferation which are the statutory responsibility of those agencies. The Department's report shall include a detailed analysis of the proliferation implications of advanced enrichment and reprocessing techniques, advanced reactors, and alternative nuclear fuel cycles. This part of the report shall include a comprehensive version which includes any relevant classified information and a summary unclassified version.
(b) The reporting requirements of this title are in addition to and not in lieu of any other reporting requirements under applicable law.
(c) The Department of State, the Arms Control and Disarmament Agency, the Department of Commerce, the Department of Energy, and the Commission shall keep the Committees on Foreign Relations and Governmental Affairs of the Senate and the Committee on International Relations of the House of Representatives fully and currently informed with respect to their activities to carry out the purposes and policies of this Act and to otherwise prevent proliferation, and with respect to the current activities of foreign nations which are of significance from the proliferation standpoint.
(d) Any classified portions of the reports required by this Act shall be submitted to the Senate Foreign Relations Committee and the House International Relations Committee.
(e) Three years after enactment of this Act, the Comptroller General shall complete a study and report to the Congress on the implementation and impact of this Act on the nuclear non-proliferation policies, purposes, and objectives of this Act. The Secretaries of State, Energy, Defense, and Commerce and the Commission and the Director shall cooperate with the Comptroller General in the conduct of the study. The report shall contain such recommendations as the Comptroller General deems necessary to support the nuclear non-proliferation policies, purposes, and objectives of this Act.

==== Saving Clause ====
(a) All agreements, certificates, contracts, determinations, licenses, orders, permits, privileges, regulations, and rules —

(1) Which have been allowed, granted, issued, or made to become effective in the exercise of functions which are the subject of this Act, by any agency or officer, or part thereof, in exercising the functions which are affected by this Act, or any court of competent jurisdiction
(2) Which are in effect at the time this Act takes effect, shall continue in effect according to their terms until modified, repealed, set aside, superseded, or terminated or as the case may be, by the parties thereto or by any court of competent jurisdiction.

(b) Nothing in this Act shall affect the procedures or requirements applicable to agreements for cooperation entered into pursuant of the 1954 Act or arrangements pursuant thereto as it was in effect immediately prior to the date of enactment of this Act.
(c) Except where otherwise provided, the provisions of this Act shall take effect immediately upon enactment regardless of any requirement for the promulgation of regulations to implement such provisions.

== Amendments to 1978 Act ==
Amendments and revisions to the Nuclear Non-Proliferation Act of 1978.

| Date of Enactment | Public Law Number | U.S. Statute Citation | U.S. Legislative Bill | U.S. Presidential Administration |
|---|---|---|---|---|
| August 14, 1979 | P.L. 96-53 | 93 Stat. 359 | H.R. 3324 | Jimmy E. Carter |
| October 23, 1992 | P.L. 102-484 | 106 Stat. 2315 | H.R. 5006 | George H.W. Bush |
| April 30, 1994 | P.L. 103-236 | 108 Stat. 382 | H.R. 2333 | William J. Clinton |

== Physical Protection of Nuclear Material International Agreement ==
The Convention on the Physical Protection of Nuclear Material was a document drafted between October 1977 and October 1979 by fifty-eight foreign States in conjunction with International Atomic Energy Agency. The international agreement established twenty-three Articles declaring the significance of decisive physical protection with regards to nuclear materials utilized for military and nuclear energy applications. The U.S. 97th Congressional session passed legislation H.R. 5228 amending U.S. criminal code Title 18 and endorsing the international atomic policy. United States public law 97-351 was signed into law by U.S. President Ronald Reagan on October 18, 1982.

== See also ==
- Anti-Ballistic Missile Treaty
- Arms Control and Disarmament Act of 1961
- Atomic Energy Act of 1946
- Conference on Disarmament
- Détente
- EURATOM Cooperation Act of 1958
- Intercontinental ballistic missile
- List of Soviet Union–United States summits
- Multiple independently targetable reentry vehicle
- Nuclear arms race
- Nuclear fuel cycle information system
- Peaceful Nuclear Explosions Treaty of 1976
- Strategic Arms Limitation Talks (SALT)
- Submarine-launched ballistic missile
- Threshold Test Ban Treaty of 1974
- Treaty on the Non-Proliferation of Nuclear Weapons (Non-Proliferation Treaty or NPT)
- United States Strategic Bombing Survey
