= Directorate of Defense Trade Controls =

Organization in the U.S. Department of State

The Bureau of Political-Military Affairs' Directorate of Defense Trade Controls (DDTC) is the organization within the U.S. Department of State responsible for enforcing the International Traffic in Arms Regulations (ITAR). In accordance with 22. U.S.C. 2778-2780 of the Arms Export Control Act (AECA), DDTC is charged with controlling the export and temporary import of defense articles and defense services covered by the United States Munitions List (USML). DDTC ensures that U.S. defense trade supports the national security and foreign policy interests of the United States, seeking to deny adversaries of the United States access to U.S. defense technology while ensuring interoperability among allies and coalition forces.

DDTC consists of the Office of Defense Trade Controls Policy (DTCP), the Office of Defense Trade Controls Licensing (DTCL), and the Office of Defense Trade Controls Compliance (DTCC).
