= United States Munitions List =

Designations of export-controlled material

The United States Munitions List (USML) is a list of articles, services, and related technology designated as defense and space-related by the United States federal government. This designation is pursuant to sections 38 and 47(7) of the Arms Export Control Act (22 U.S.C. 2778 and 2794(7)). These articles fall under the export and temporary import jurisdiction of the Department of State.

The USML is found in Part 121 of Title 22, Foreign Relations, of the Code of Federal Regulations. The Directorate of Defense Trade Controls administers the regulations. The USML is amended by rules published in the Federal Register. Further information and clarification whether specific articles or services fall under the USML are periodically discussed in Defense Trade News, published by the State Department's Bureau of Political-Military Affairs.

Any article, service, or related data found to be on the USML requires an export license issued by the United States State Department to be exported (given to a non-U.S. person). A "U.S. person" is a U.S. citizen or permanent resident who does not work for a foreign company, government, or non-governmental organization. Some license exceptions are available under specific circumstances.

Exports of products not covered by the USML are most likely subject to the export jurisdiction of the United States Department of Commerce, Bureau of Industry and Security. Numerous other U.S. federal agencies have their own niche export control regulations. The first step in exporting a Commerce Control List item under the Bureau of Industry and Security regulations is to identify the Export Control Classification Number (ECCN).

== Categories ==
The 21 categories of articles on the USML are:

1. Firearms, Close Assault Weapons and Combat Shotgun
2. Guns and Armament
3. Ammunition/Ordnance
4. Launch Vehicles, Guided Missiles, Ballistic Missiles, Rockets, Torpedoes, Bombs, and Mines
5. Explosives and Energetic Materials, Propellants, Incendiary Agents, and Their Constituents
6. Surface Vessels of War and Special Naval Equipment
7. Ground Vehicles
8. Aircraft and Related Articles
9. Military Training Equipment and Training
10. Personal Protective Equipment
11. Military Electronics
12. Fire Control, Range Finder, Optical and Guidance and Control Equipment, Night vision goggles
13. Materials and Miscellaneous Articles
14. Toxicological Agents, Including Chemical Agents, Biological Agents, and Associated Equipment
15. Spacecraft and Related Articles
16. Nuclear Weapons Related Articles
17. Classified Articles, Technical Data, and Defense Services Not Otherwise Enumerated
18. Directed Energy Weapons
19. Gas Turbine Engines and Associated Equipment
20. Submersible Vessels and Related Articles
21. Articles, Technical Data, and Defense Services Not Otherwise Enumerated
