= Arms Export Control Act =

United States law

- Other short titles: Arms Export Control Act of 1976
- Long title: An Act to amend the Foreign Assistance Act of 1961 and the Foreign Military Sales Act, and for other purposes.
- Nicknames: International Security Assistance and Arms Exports Control Act
- Enacted by: the 94th United States Congress
- Effective: June 30, 1976

Citations
- Public law: 94-329
- Statutes at Large: 90 Stat. 729

Codification
- Titles amended: 22 U.S.C.: Foreign Relations and Intercourse
- U.S.C. sections created: 22 U.S.C. ch. 39 § 2751

Legislative history
- Introduced in the House as H.R. 13680 by Thomas E. Morgan (D–PA) on May 11, 1976; Committee consideration by House International Relations; Passed the House on June 2, 1976 (255–140); Passed the Senate on June 14, 1976 (62–18, in lieu of S. 3439); Reported by the joint conference committee on June 16, 1976; agreed to by the House on June 22, 1976 (258–146) and by the Senate on June 25, 1976 (agreed); Signed into law by President Gerald Ford on June 30, 1976

The Arms Export Control Act of 1976 (Title II of Pub. L. 94–329, 90 Stat. 729, enacted June 30, 1976, codified at 22 U.S.C. ch. 39) gives the president of the United States the authority to control the import and export of defense articles and defense services. The H.R. 13680 legislation was passed by the 94th Congressional session and enacted into law by the 38th president of the United States Gerald R. Ford on June 30, 1976.

The Act of Congress requires international governments receiving weapons from the United States to use the armaments for legitimate self-defense. Consideration is given as to whether the exports "would contribute to an arms race, aid in the development of weapons of mass destruction, support international terrorism, increase the possibility of outbreak or escalation of conflict, or prejudice the development of bilateral or multilateral arms control or nonproliferation agreements or other arrangements." The act also places certain restrictions on American arms traders and manufacturers, prohibiting them from the sale of certain sensitive technologies to certain parties and requiring thorough documentation of such trades to trusted parties.

When the president is aware of the possibility of violations of the AECA, the law requires a report to Congress on the potential violations.

U.S. Immigration and Customs Enforcement (ICE) conducts an industry outreach program called the Project Shield America to prevent foreign adversaries, terrorists, and criminal networks from obtaining U.S. munitions and strategic technology.

== History ==
From 1963 to 1973, 128 nations received $2.5 trillion in weapons and services, the majority from the United States. The law only required that the Secretary of State report “significant” arms sales to Congress semi-annually. In the early 1970s, legislators moved to become involved in deciding to whom arms sales could be made and under what circumstances. Concern over arms sales increased significantly in the summer of 1973, when news surfaced of a potential Nixon Administration sale of F-4 fighter-bombers to Saudi Arabia.

In 1973, Norvill Jones, a staffer of the Senate Committee on Foreign Relations, tried to interest members in establishing a procedure by which Congress could review large arms sales. Finding no takers, Jones mentioned the idea to Paula Stern, then a foreign policy aide to Senator Gaylord Nelson of Wisconsin, later the Chairwoman of the U.S. International Trade Commission (1984–1986). Nelson approved the idea and introduced an amendment for a one-house veto over significant arms sales. Stern and Nelson settled on a reporting "tripwire" of $25 million, the cost of a squadron of F-5Es. Nelson has credited Stern with conceiving the amendment and supplying the persistence needed to steer the attention of the Senate to arms sales. Nelson's proposed floor measure passed 44 to 43 in the Senate, but a similar House measure introduced by Representative Jonathan Bingham of New York was defeated.

In 1974, a renewed attempt was passed as the Nelson-Bingham Act of 1974. It provided that when the U.S. government offered to sell any defense article or service costing $25 million or more, the President must inform both Houses of Congress of the details, giving Congress twenty days to adopt a "veto" resolution. The Nelson-Bingham initiative worked "a profound transformation in arms export policy" and had a "significant impact on U.S. government policy, both on long-range planning and on several major individual sales."

In 1975, President Gerald Ford's arms sale to Jordan led Congress to examine how to strengthen the Nelson-Bingham Amendment. A significant number of sales notifications had been allowed to be kept classified by the executive. The time period of Congressional review had been found to be deficient and the dollar level of $25 million as a tripwire had prevented a number of smaller sales from avoiding scrutiny. Members of Congress also sought to expand the scope of their review beyond government-to-government sales. The 1976 Arms Control Act incorporated these and other changes.

The scope of the act was challenged by professors and universities, who felt that restrictions placed on foreign nationals, including international students and visiting professors, were excessive. In the 1980s, Professor Bruce Lusignan of Stanford University and President C. Peter Magrath of the University of Minnesota openly violated the AECA with the support of their institutions.

== Application and enforcement ==
In the 1990s, after a report from RSA Data Security, Inc., which was in a licensing dispute with regard to use of the RSA algorithm in PGP, the Customs Service started a criminal investigation of Phil Zimmermann for allegedly violating the AECA. The US Government had long regarded cryptographic software as a munition, and thus subject to arms trafficking export controls. At that time, the boundary between permitted ("low-strength") cryptography and impermissible ("high-strength") cryptography placed PGP well on the too-strong-to-export side (this boundary has since been relaxed). The investigation lasted three years, but was finally dropped without filing charges.

From FY 2004 to FY 2006, there were 283 arrests, 198 indictments, and 166 convictions based on AECA violations.

In 2005, the Government Accounting Office (GAO) did a study on arms exports since 9/11. The study noted that the system itself had not been changed since 9/11, since the system was already designed to counter such threats. The study did report that the processing time for arms cases increased starting in 2003.

In 2006, Boeing was fined $15 million for unlicensed foreign sales involving a gyroscopic microchip or gyrochip with military applications.

In March 2007, ITT Corporation was fined for criminal violation of the act. The fines resulted from ITT's outsourcing program, in which they transferred night vision goggles and classified information about countermeasures against laser weapons, including light interference filters, to engineers in Singapore, the People's Republic of China, and the United Kingdom. They were fined $100 million US dollars, although they were also given the option of spending half of that sum on research and development of new night-vision technology. The United States government will assume rights to the resulting intellectual property.

In January 2009, Congressman Dennis Kucinich sent a notice to the then Secretary of State, Condoleezza Rice, that Israel's actions in Gaza since December 27, 2008 may constitute a violation of the requirements of the AECA. The AECA requires that each nation that receives a shipment of arms from the United States must certify that the weapons are used for internal security and legitimate self-defense, and that their use does not lead to an escalation of conflict. However, the AECA does not define "internal security" or "legitimate self-defense." Kucinich said that Israel's actions in Gaza killed nearly 600 and injured over 2,500, including innocent civilians and children in residential areas and civilian institutions like schools. Kucinich said that this may have violated the AECA because they didn't further Israel's internal security or legitimate self-defense, but increased the possibility of an outbreak or escalation of conflict. The charges were denied by the IDF and no action has been taken under the act.

In July 2009, John Reece Roth, a former University of Tennessee professor, was convicted of violating the AECA and sentenced to 48 months in prison. Roth had a United States Air Force (USAF) contract to develop plasma technology to reduce drag on airplane wings. One application was for unmanned air vehicles (drones). Roth was accused of violating the law by sharing technical (not classified) data with Chinese and Iranian graduate students, and of having technical data on his laptop during a trip to China. Roth and others said that the AECA, as applied in his case, would violate academic freedom and force professors to discriminate against students on the basis of nationality.

Harris Corporation, prior to its 2019 L3 Technologies merger, settled a $13 million export violation to Canada of unauthorized transfers of software, military radios and other military gear after a report of 131 alleged violations by the State Department's Directorate of Defense Trade Controls. L3Harris Technologies also admitted that T7 robots had been temporarily transferred to Thailand, Singapore and Germany without proper authorizations.

A September 2025 report by the GAO found that the State Department had no formal process to report violations, resulting in only 3 of over 150 incidents being reported to Congress.

From 2024 to 2026, the US Government continued to enforce the AECA through criminal and civil prosecutions, corporate settlements, and administrative debarments. In 2024, RTX Corporation agreed to an administrative settlement of $200 million to resolve alleged 750 AECA violations. Two individuals were sentenced in January 2026 for exporting weapons to South Sudan in violation of the AECA. In February 2026, the US Department of Justice filed a criminal complaint against a former US military personnel for providing and conspiring to provide defense services to Chinese military pilots in violation of the AECA.

== See also ==
- Arms Control and Disarmament Act of 1961
- Foreign Military Sales Act of 1968
- Foreign Military Sales Act of 1971
- International Traffic in Arms Regulations
- Symington Amendment
