= Cryptography law =

Laws relating to encryption

Cryptography is the practice and study of encrypting information, or in other words, securing information from unauthorized access. There are many different cryptography laws in different nations. Some countries prohibit the export of cryptography software and/or encryption algorithms or cryptanalysis methods. Some countries require decryption keys to be recoverable in case of a police investigation.

== Overview ==
Issues regarding cryptography law fall into four categories:

- Export control, is the restriction on the export of cryptography methods within a country to other countries or commercial entities. There are international export control agreements, the main one being the Wassenaar Arrangement. The Wassenaar Arrangement was created after the dissolution of COCOM (Coordinating Committee for Multilateral Export Controls), which in 1989 "decontrolled password and authentication-only cryptography."
- Import controls, which is the restriction on using certain types of cryptography within a country.
- Patent issues, deal with the use of cryptography tools that are patented.
- Search and seizure issues, on whether and under what circumstances, a person can be compelled to decrypt data files or reveal an encryption key.

== Legal issues ==
=== Prohibitions ===
Cryptography has long been of interest to intelligence gathering and law enforcement agencies. Secret communications may be criminal or even treasonous. Because of its facilitation of privacy, and the diminution of privacy attendant on its prohibition, cryptography is also of considerable interest to civil rights supporters. Accordingly, there has been a history of controversial legal issues surrounding cryptography, especially since the advent of inexpensive computers has made widespread access to high-quality cryptography possible.

In some countries, even the domestic use of cryptography is, or has been, restricted. Until 1999, France significantly restricted the use of cryptography domestically, though it has since relaxed many of these rules. In China and Iran, a license is still required to use cryptography. Many countries have tight restrictions on the use of cryptography. Among the more restrictive are laws in Belarus, Kazakhstan, Mongolia, Pakistan, Singapore, Tunisia, and Vietnam.

In the United States, cryptography is legal for domestic use, but there has been much conflict over legal issues related to cryptography. One particularly important issue has been the export of cryptography and cryptographic software and hardware. Probably because of the importance of cryptanalysis in World War II and an expectation that cryptography would continue to be important for national security, many Western governments have, at some point, strictly regulated export of cryptography. After World War II, it was illegal in the US to sell or distribute encryption technology overseas; in fact, encryption was designated as auxiliary military equipment and put on the United States Munitions List. Until the development of the personal computer, asymmetric key algorithms (i.e., public key techniques), and the Internet, this was not especially problematic. However, as the Internet grew and computers became more widely available, high-quality encryption techniques became well known around the globe.

=== Export controls ===
In the 1990s, there were several challenges to US export regulation of cryptography. After the source code for Philip Zimmermann's Pretty Good Privacy (PGP) encryption program found its way onto the Internet in June 1991, a complaint by RSA Security (then called RSA Data Security, Inc.) resulted in a lengthy criminal investigation of Zimmermann by the US Customs Service and the FBI, though no charges were ever filed. Daniel J. Bernstein, then a graduate student at UC Berkeley, brought a lawsuit against the US government challenging some aspects of the restrictions based on free speech grounds. The 1995 case Bernstein v. United States ultimately resulted in a 1999 decision that printed source code for cryptographic algorithms and systems was protected as free speech by the United States Constitution.

In 1996, thirty-nine countries signed the Wassenaar Arrangement, an arms control treaty that deals with the export of arms and "dual-use" technologies such as cryptography. The treaty stipulated that the use of cryptography with short key-lengths (56-bit for symmetric encryption, 512-bit for RSA) would no longer be export-controlled. Cryptography exports from the US became less strictly regulated as a consequence of a major relaxation in 2000; there are no longer very many restrictions on key sizes in US-exported mass-market software. Since this relaxation in US export restrictions, and because most personal computers connected to the Internet include US-sourced web browsers such as Firefox or Internet Explorer, almost every Internet user worldwide has potential access to quality cryptography via their browsers (e.g., via Transport Layer Security). The Mozilla Thunderbird and Microsoft Outlook E-mail client programs can similarly transmit and receive emails via TLS, and can send and receive emails encrypted with S/MIME. Many Internet users don't realize that their basic application software contains such extensive cryptosystems. These browsers and email programs are so ubiquitous that even governments whose intent is to regulate civilian use of cryptography generally don't find it practical to do much to control distribution or use of cryptography of this quality, so even when such laws are in force, actual enforcement is often effectively impossible.

=== NSA involvement ===
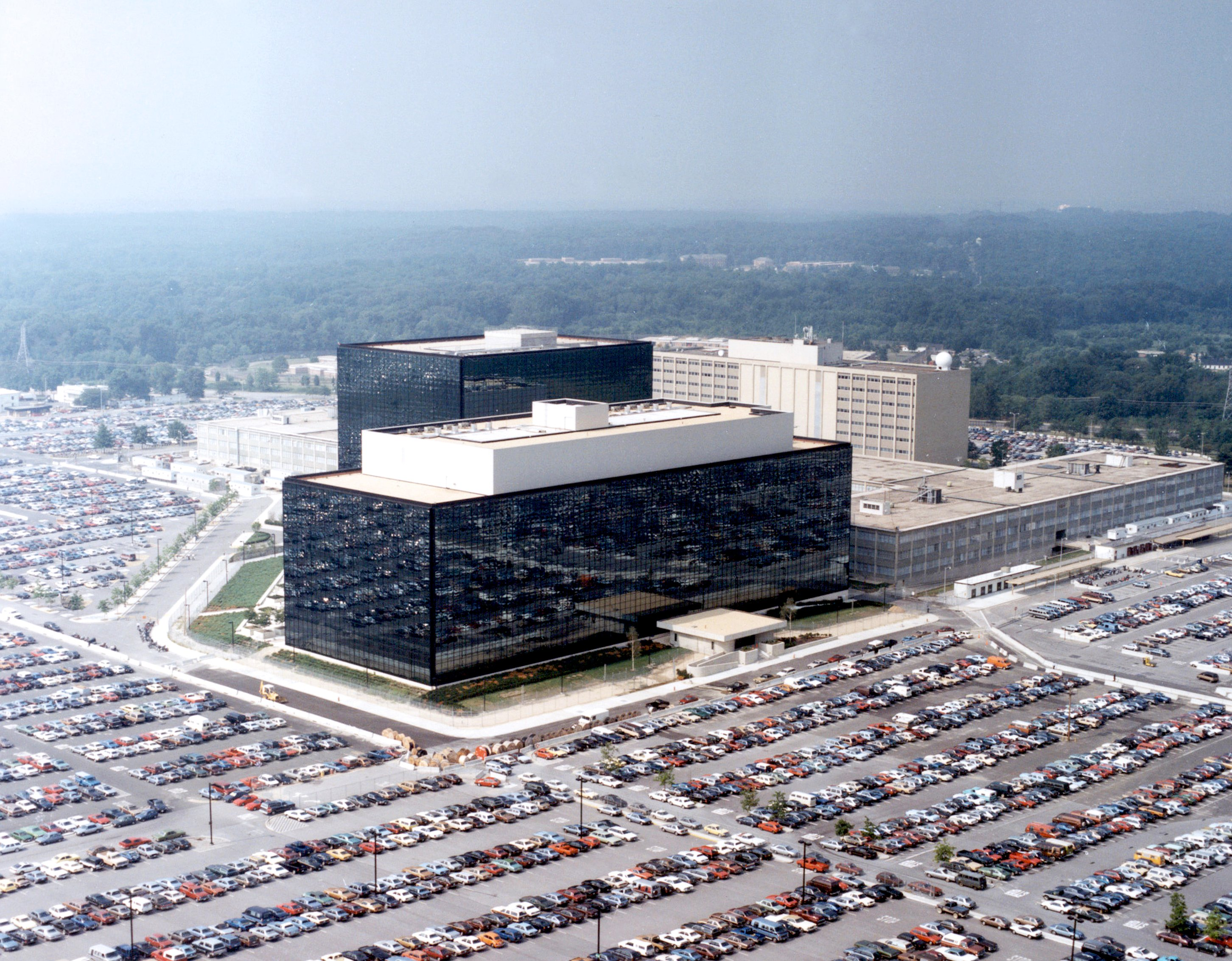
NSA headquarters in Fort Meade, Maryland

Another contentious issue connected to cryptography in the United States is the influence of the National Security Agency on cipher development and policy. The NSA was involved with the design of DES during its development at IBM and its consideration by the National Bureau of Standards as a possible Federal Standard for cryptography. DES was designed to be resistant to differential cryptanalysis, a powerful and general cryptanalytic technique known to the NSA and IBM, that became publicly known only when it was rediscovered in the late 1980s. According to Steven Levy, IBM discovered differential cryptanalysis, but kept the technique secret at the NSA's request. The technique became publicly known only when Biham and Shamir re-discovered and announced it some years later. The entire affair illustrates the difficulty of determining what resources and knowledge an attacker might actually have.

Another instance of the NSA's involvement was the 1993 Clipper chip affair, an encryption microchip intended to be part of the Capstone cryptography-control initiative. Clipper was widely criticized by cryptographers for two reasons. The cipher algorithm (called Skipjack) was then classified (declassified in 1998, long after the Clipper initiative lapsed). The classified cipher caused concerns that the NSA had deliberately made the cipher weak in order to assist its intelligence efforts. The whole initiative was also criticized based on its violation of Kerckhoffs's Principle, as the scheme included a special escrow key held by the government for use by law enforcement (i.e. wiretapping).

=== Digital rights management ===
Cryptography is central to digital rights management (DRM), a group of techniques for technologically controlling use of copyrighted material, being widely implemented and deployed at the behest of some copyright holders. In 1998, U.S. President Bill Clinton signed the Digital Millennium Copyright Act (DMCA), which criminalized all production, dissemination, and use of certain cryptanalytic techniques and technology (now known or later discovered); specifically, those that could be used to circumvent DRM technological schemes. This had a noticeable impact on the cryptography research community since an argument can be made that any cryptanalytic research violated the DMCA. Similar statutes have since been enacted in several countries and regions, including the implementation in the EU Copyright Directive. Similar restrictions are called for by treaties signed by World Intellectual Property Organization member-states.

The United States Department of Justice and FBI have not enforced the DMCA as rigorously as had been feared by some, but the law, nonetheless, remains a controversial one. Niels Ferguson, a well-respected cryptography researcher, has publicly stated that he will not release some of his research into an Intel security design for fear of prosecution under the DMCA. Cryptologist Bruce Schneier has argued that the DMCA encourages vendor lock-in, while inhibiting actual measures toward cyber-security. Both Alan Cox (longtime Linux kernel developer) and Edward Felten (and some of his students at Princeton) have encountered problems related to the Act. Dmitry Sklyarov was arrested during a visit to the US from Russia, and jailed for five months pending trial for alleged violations of the DMCA arising from work he had done in Russia, where the work was legal. In 2007, the cryptographic keys responsible for Blu-ray and HD DVD content scrambling were discovered and released onto the Internet. In both cases, the Motion Picture Association of America sent out numerous DMCA takedown notices, and there was a massive Internet backlash triggered by the perceived impact of such notices on fair use and free speech.

=== Forced disclosure of encryption keys ===
In the United Kingdom, the Regulation of Investigatory Powers Act gives UK police the powers to force suspects to decrypt files or hand over passwords that protect encryption keys. Failure to comply is an offense in its own right, punishable on conviction by a two-year jail sentence or up to five years in cases involving national security. Successful prosecutions have occurred under the Act; the first, in 2009, resulted in a term of 13 months' imprisonment. Similar forced disclosure laws in Australia, Finland, France, and India compel individual suspects under investigation to hand over encryption keys or passwords during a criminal investigation.

In the United States, the federal criminal case of United States v. Fricosu addressed whether a search warrant can compel a person to reveal an encryption passphrase or password. The Electronic Frontier Foundation (EFF) argued that this is a violation of the protection from self-incrimination given by the Fifth Amendment. In 2012, the court ruled that under the All Writs Act, the defendant was required to produce an unencrypted hard drive for the court.

In many jurisdictions, the legal status of forced disclosure remains unclear.

The 2016 FBI–Apple encryption dispute concerns the ability of courts in the United States to compel manufacturers' assistance in unlocking cell phones whose contents are cryptographically protected.

As a potential counter-measure to forced disclosure some cryptographic software supports plausible deniability, where the encrypted data is indistinguishable from unused random data (for example such as that of a drive which has been securely wiped).

== Cryptography law in different countries ==
=== China ===
In October 1999, the State Council promulgated the Regulations on the Administration of Commercial Cryptography. According to these regulations, commercial cryptography was treated as a state secret.

On 26 October 2019, the Standing Committee of the National People's Congress promulgated the Cryptography Law of the People's Republic of China. This law went into effect at the start of 2020. The law categorizes cryptography into three categories:

- Core cryptography, which is a state secret and suitable for information up to top secret;
- Ordinary cryptography, which is also a state secret and suitable for information up to secret;
- Commercial cryptography, which protects information that is not a state secret.

The law also states that there should be a "mechanism of both in-process and ex-post supervision on commercial cryptography, which combines routine supervision with random inspection" (implying that the Chinese government should get access to encrypted servers). It also states that foreign providers of commercial encryption need some sort of state approval.

Cryptosystems authorized for use in China include SM2, SM3, SM4 and SM9.

=== France ===
As of 2011 and since 2004, the law for trust in the digital economy (French: Loi pour la confiance dans l'économie numérique; abbreviated LCEN) mostly liberalized the use of cryptography.

- As long as cryptography is only used for authentication and integrity purposes, it can be freely used. The cryptographic key or the nationality of the entities involved in the transaction do not matter. Typical e-business websites fall under this liberalized regime.
- Exportation and importation of cryptographic tools to or from foreign countries must be either declared (when the other country is a member of the European Union) or requires an explicit authorization (for countries outside the EU).

=== India ===
Section 69 of the Information Technology Act, 2000 (as amended in 2008) authorizes Indian government officials or policemen to listen in on any phone calls, read any SMS messages or emails, or monitor the websites that anyone visits, without requiring a warrant. (However, this is a violation of article 21 of the Constitution of India.) This section also enables the central government of India or a state government of India to compel any agency to decrypt information.

According to the Information Technology (Intermediaries Guidelines) Rules, 2011, intermediaries are required to provide information to Indian government agencies for investigative or other purposes.

ISP license holders are freely allowed to use encryption keys up to 40 bits. Beyond that, they are required to obtain written permission and to deposit the decryption key with the Department of Telecommunications.

Per the 2012 SEBI Master Circular for Stock Exchange or Cash Market (issued by the Securities and Exchange Board of India), it is the responsibility of stock exchanges to maintain data reliability and confidentiality through the use of encryption. Per Reserve Bank of India guidance issued in 2001, banks must use at least 128-bit SSL to protect browser-to-bank communication; they must also encrypt sensitive data internally.

Electronics, including cryptographic products, is one of the categories of dual-use items in the Special Chemicals, Organisms, Materials, Equipment and Technologies (SCOMET; part of the Foreign Trade (Development & Regulation Act), 1992). However, this regulation does not specify which cryptographic products are subject to export controls.

=== United States ===
In the United States, the International Traffic in Arms Regulation restricts the export of cryptography.

== See also ==
- Official Secrets Act - (United Kingdom, India, Ireland, Malaysia and formerly New Zealand)
- Regulation of Investigatory Powers Act 2000 (United Kingdom)
- Restrictions on the import of cryptography
- United States v. Boucher (2009), on the right of a criminal defendant not to reveal a passphrase
- FBI–Apple encryption dispute on whether cellphone manufacturers can be compelled to assist in their unlocking
