= Dual-use technology =

Technology that can be used for both peaceful and military purposes

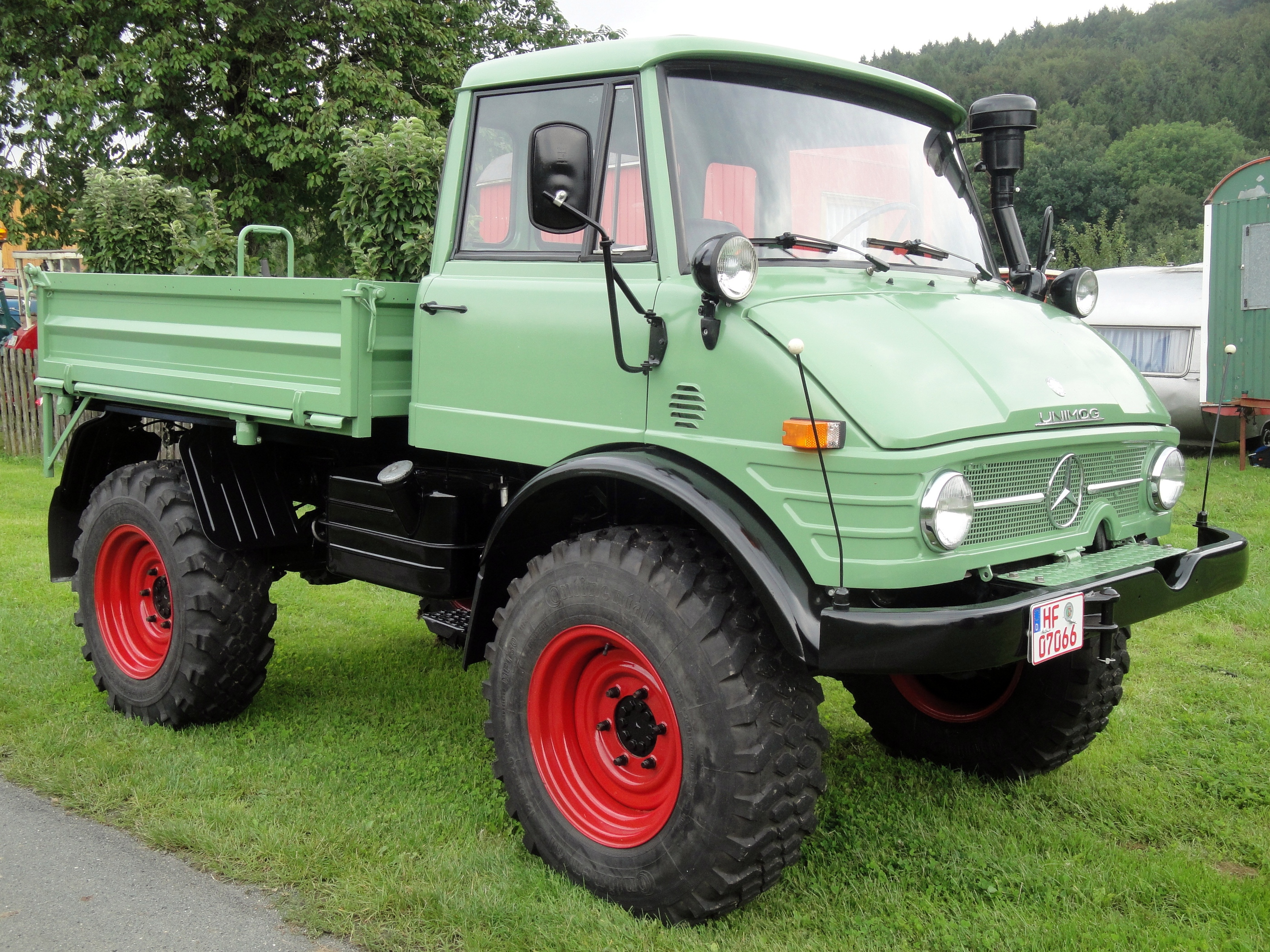
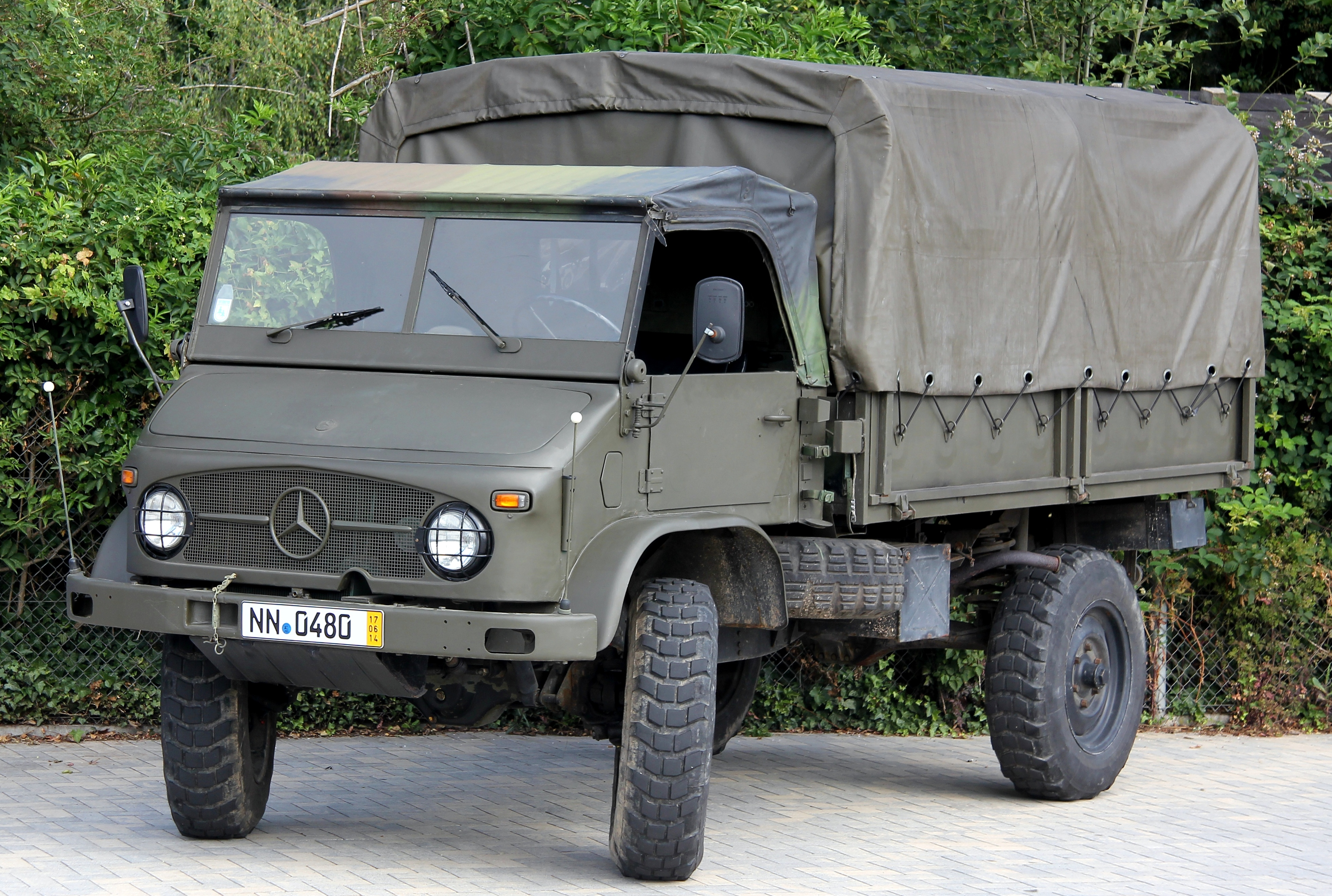
Unimog trucks are an example of a dual-use good used in both civil and military contexts.

In politics, diplomacy and export control, dual-use items refer to equipment, machines, goods and technology (both hardware and software) that can be used for both civilian and military applications.

More generally speaking, dual-use can also refer to any matériel or technology which can satisfy more than one goal at any given time. Thus, expensive technologies originally benefitting only military purposes would in the future also be used to serve peacetime civilian commercial interests if they were not otherwise engaged, such as the Global Positioning System developed by the U.S. Department of Defense.

The so-called "dual-use dilemma", where technologies that were initially developed for peaceful applications later undergo weaponization, has long been known in chemistry and physics. It was first noted with the invention of the Haber process for mass production of ammonia, which revolutionized agriculture with modern fertilizers but also led to the creation of chemical weapons during the First World War. The advent of nuclear physics and associated technologies, while first utilized in medicine in the form of radiography and radiation therapy, became instrumental in the development of mass-destruction atom bombs during the Second World War and Cold War, subsequently causing concerns regarding nuclear escalation, proliferation and the threat of nuclear terrorism and dirty bombs. These have led to international conventions and treaties, including the Chemical Weapons Convention and the Treaty on the Non-Proliferation of Nuclear Weapons.

== Drones ==
Unmanned aerial vehicles (UAVs), commonly known as drones, are an example of dual-use technology, as similar systems may be used for civilian purposes such as photography, surveying and inspections, as well as for military reconnaissance, surveillance and other security applications. Their operation is subject to airspace restrictions, including no-drone zones and other geographical zones established around airports, military facilities, critical infrastructure and other sensitive locations. For example in Poland, civilian drone operations are regulated according to their level of risk and may fall within the open, specific or certified category.

The growing use of UAVs has also created challenges for military forces and operators of critical infrastructure, contributing to the development of counter-UAS systems, including interceptor drones designed to detect, track or neutralise hostile UAVs. Depending on their technical characteristics and intended use, such systems may be subject to military-product, aviation or export-control regulations, illustrating the difficulty of distinguishing between civilian and military applications of dual-use technologies.

== Missiles ==
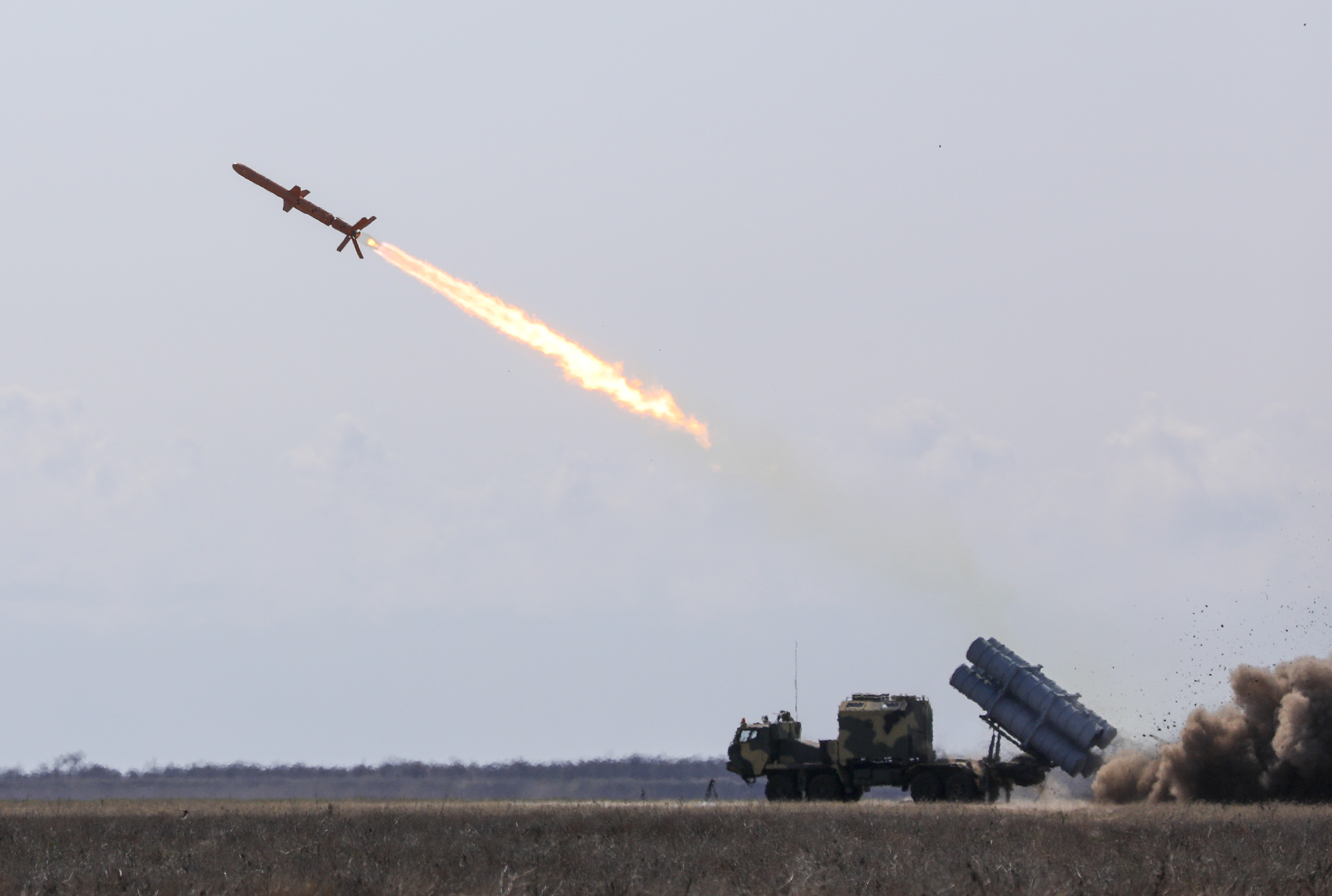
Neptune cruise missile launch

Originally developed as weapons during the Cold War, the United States and the Soviet Union spent billions of dollars developing rocket technology which could carry humans into space (and eventually to the Moon). The development of this peaceful rocket technology paralleled the development of intercontinental ballistic missile technology; and was a way of demonstrating to the other side the potential of one's own rockets.

Those who seek to develop ballistic missiles may claim that their rockets are for peaceful purposes; for example, for commercial satellite launching or scientific purposes. However, even genuinely peaceful rockets may be converted into weapons and provide the technological basis to do so.

Within peaceful rocket programs, different peaceful applications can be seen as having parallel military roles. For example, the return of scientific payloads safely to earth from orbit would indicate re-entry vehicle capability and demonstrating the ability to launch multiple satellites with a single launch vehicle can be seen in a military context as having the potential to deploy multiple independently targetable reentry vehicles.

== Nuclear energy ==
Many technologies and materials associated with the creation of a civilian nuclear power program have a dual-use capability, in that several stages of the nuclear fuel cycle allow diversion of nuclear materials for nuclear weapons. When this happens a nuclear power program can become a route leading to the atomic bomb or a public annex to a secret bomb program. The crisis over Iran's nuclear activities is a case in point.

Many UN and US agencies warn that building more nuclear reactors unavoidably increases nuclear proliferation risks. A fundamental goal for American and global security is to minimize the proliferation risks associated with the expansion of nuclear power. If this development is "poorly managed or efforts to contain risks are unsuccessful, the nuclear future will be dangerous". For nuclear power programs to be developed and managed safely and securely, it is important that countries have domestic "good governance" characteristics that will encourage proper nuclear operations and management:

These characteristics include low degrees of corruption (to avoid officials selling materials and technology for their own personal gain as occurred with the A. Q. Khan smuggling network in Pakistan), high degrees of political stability (defined by the World Bank as "likelihood that the government will be destabilized or overthrown by unconstitutional or violent means, including politically-motivated violence and terrorism"), high governmental effectiveness scores (a World Bank aggregate measure of "the quality of the civil service and the degree of its independence from political pressures [and] the quality of policy formulation and implementation"), and a strong degree of regulatory competence.

== Artificial intelligence ==
As more advances are made towards artificial intelligence (AI), it garners more and more attention on its capability as a dual-use technology and the security risks it may pose. Artificial intelligence can be applied within many different fields and can be easily integrated throughout current technology's cyberspace. With the use of AI, technology has become capable of running multiple algorithms that could solve difficult problems, from detecting anomalies in samples during MRI scans, to providing surveillance of an entire country's residents. Within the United States’ mass surveillance, the government uses AI in order to distinguish citizens with less than satisfactory records among crowds. This becomes apparent in the banking system as credit score. Every new invention or application made with AI comes with its own set of positive and negative effects. Some claim that, as potential uses for AI grow in number, nations need to start regulating it as a dual-use technology.

== Chemical ==
The modern history of chemical weapons can be traced back to the chemical industries of the belligerent nations of World War I, especially that of Germany. Many industrial chemical processes produce toxic intermediary stages, final products, and by-products, and any nation with a chemical industry has the potential to create weaponised chemical agents. Chlorine is a chemical agent found within several household items such as Bleach and provides various benefits with its wide array of applications. However, its gaseous form can also be used as a chemical weapon.

== Biological ==
The July 2007 terrorist attacks in central London and at Glasgow airport was a recent biosecurity wake-up call when it was discovered that doctors which could have access to pathogens were among the suspects. The challenge remains to maintain security without impairing the contributions to progress afforded by research.

Reports from the project on building a sustainable culture in dual-use bioethics suggest that, as a result of perceived changes in both science and security over the past decade, several states and multilateral bodies have underlined the importance of making life scientists aware of concerns over dual-use and the legal obligations underpinning the prevention of biological weapons. One of the key mechanisms that have been identified to achieve this is through the education of life science students, with the objective of building what has been termed a “culture of responsibility”.

At the 2008 Meeting of States Parties to the Biological and Toxin Weapons Convention (BTWC), it was agreed by consensus that: States Parties recognized the importance of ensuring that those working in the biological sciences are aware of their obligations under the convention and relevant national legislation and guidelines...States Parties noted that formal requirements for seminars, modules or courses, including possible mandatory components, in relevant scientific and engineering training programmes and continuing professional education could assist in raising awareness and in implementing the convention.

The World Health Organization in 2010 developed a "guidance document" for what it called "Dual Use Research of Concern" (DURC) in the life sciences, regarding “research that is intended [to] benefit, but which might easily be misapplied to do harm".

Along with several similar stipulations from other states and regional organisations, biosecurity education has become more important. Unfortunately, both the policy and academic literature show that life scientists across the globe are frequently uninformed or underinformed about biosecurity, dual-use, the BTWC and national legislation outlawing biological weapons. Moreover, despite numerous declarations by states and multilateral organisations, the extent to which statements at the international level have trickled down to multifaceted activity at the level of scientists remains limited.

The US federal government (USG) developed several policy documents on DURC. In May 2024, the White House published the "United States Government Policy for Oversight of Dual Use Research of Concern and Pathogens with Enhanced Pandemic Potential", "a unified federal oversight framework for conducting and managing certain types of federally funded life sciences research on biological agents and toxins." The policy superseded several prior documents, published in 2012, 2014, and 2017, and it follows the directives established by the 2022 National Biodefense Strategy and Implementation Plan.

== Night-vision and thermal imaging ==
Night-vision devices with extraordinary performance characteristics (high gain, specific spectral sensitivity, fine resolution, low noise) are heavily export-restricted by the few states capable of producing them, mainly to limit their proliferation to enemy combatants, but also to slow the inevitable reverse-engineering undertaken by other world powers.

These precision components, such as the image intensifiers used in night-vision goggles and the focal-plane arrays found in surveillance satellites and thermal cameras, have numerous civil applications which include nature photography, medical imaging, firefighting, and population control of predator species.

Night scenes of wild elephants and rhinos in the BBC nature documentary series Africa were shot on a Lunax Starlight HD camera (a custom-built digital cinema rig encompassing a Generation 3 image intensifier), and recolored digitally.

In the United States, civilians are free to buy and sell American-made night vision and thermal systems, such as those manufactured by defense contractors Harris, L3 Insight, and FLIR Systems, with very few restrictions. However, American night vision owners may not bring the equipment out of the country, sell it internationally, or even invite non-citizens to examine the technology, per International Traffic in Arms Regulations.

Export of American image intensifiers is selectively permitted under license by the United States Department of Commerce and the State Department. Contributing factors in acquiring a license include diplomatic relations with the destination country, number of pieces to be sold, and the relative quality of the equipment itself, expressed using a Figure Of Merit (FOM) score calculated from several key performance characteristics.

Competing international manufacturers (European defense contractor Exosens Group, Japanese scientific instrument giant Hamamatsu Photonics, and Russian state-financed laboratory JSC Katod) have entered the American market through licensed importers. In spite of their foreign origin, re-export of these components outside of the United States is restricted similarly to domestic components.

A 2012 assessment of the sector by the Department of Commerce and Bureau of Industry and Security made the case for relaxing export controls in light of the narrowing performance gap and increased competition internationally, and a review period undertaken by the Directorate of Defense Trade Controls in 2015 introduced much more granular performance definitions.

== Other technologies ==
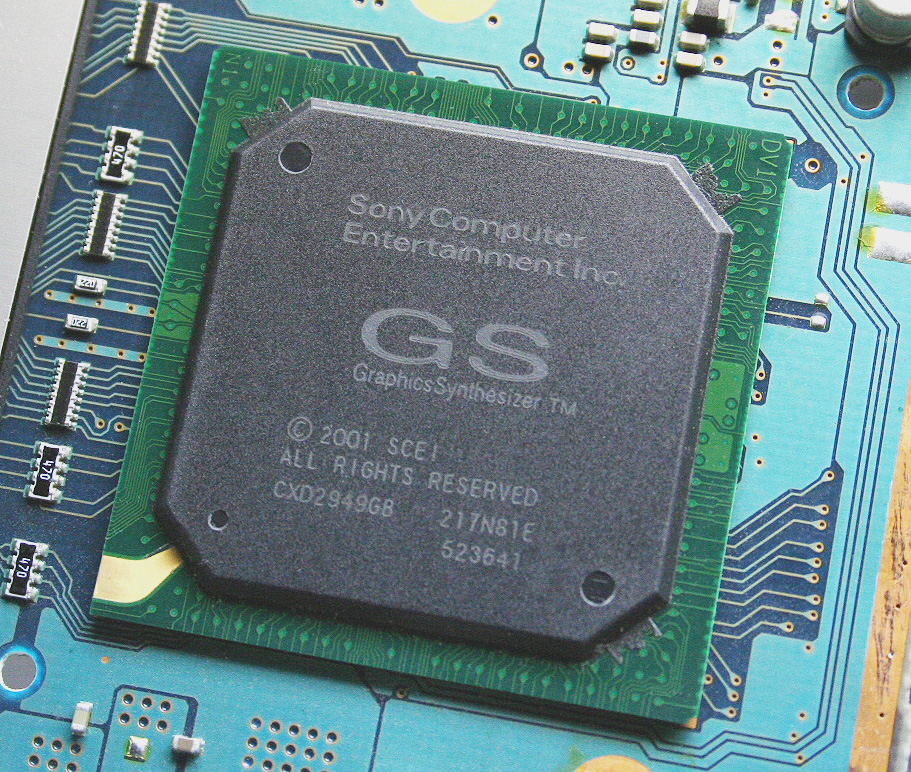
PlayStation 2's graphics processor

In addition to obvious dual-use technologies there are some less obvious ones, in that many erstwhile peaceful technologies can be used in weapons. One example during the First and Second World War is the role of German toy manufacturers: Germany was one of the leading nations in the production of wind-up toys, and the ability to produce large numbers of small and reliable clockwork motors was converted into the ability to produce shell and bomb fuzes. During its early stages of release, the PlayStation 2 was considered to be a dual-use technology. The gaming console had to receive special import regulations before being shipped towards the U.S. and European markets. This is due to the console's and its included GPU's capability to process high quality images at high speeds, a shared trait with missile guidance systems.

=== HoloLens 2 ===
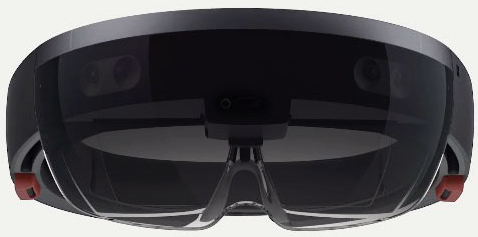
Microsoft's HoloLens 2

Early 2019, Microsoft announced the HoloLens 2, smart glasses that will allow consumers to experience augmented reality within the real world. However, it was revealed Microsoft made a 479 million dollar deal with the U.S. government. This contract would have Microsoft create and supply the U.S. Army a separate version of the HoloLens smart glasses called the Integrated Visual Augmentation System (IVAS). The IVAS would be used to train soldiers, as well as field medics with battlefield experience within a virtual environment. This version of the HoloLens allowed the soldiers to have a virtual map of their current environment, friendly units' locations, and much more. An anonymous Microsoft employee published an open letter demanding that Microsoft terminate the IVAS contract.

== Control ==
Most industrial countries have export controls on certain types of designated dual-use technologies, and they are required by a number of treaties as well. These controls restrict the export of certain commodities and technologies without the permission of the government.

In the context of sanctions regimes, dual-use can be construed broadly because there are few things which do not have the potential for both military and civilian uses.

=== China ===
China maintains a dual-use export control list, which includes around 800 items in 10 categories. The list is maintained by the Ministry of Commerce.

=== United States ===
The principal agency for investigating violations of dual-use export controls in the United States is the Bureau of Industry and Security (BIS) Office of Export Enforcement (OEE). Interagency coordination of export control cases are conducted through the Export Enforcement Coordination Center (E2C2). The International Traffic in Arms Regulations is the US regime that the BIS OEE enforces.

=== Canada ===
The Canadian legislation to govern the trade in dual-use technology is known as the Export and Imports Permits Act.

=== European Union ===
The European Union governs dual-use technology through the Control List of Dual Use Items.

The EU's dual-use control list, Annex I of Regulation (EU) 2021/821, is updated at least annually to incorporate changes from international regimes and address emerging security challenges. The 2025 update is particularly notable for introducing a new "500" series of classification numbers (e.g., 4A506 for quantum computers).

This series was created to control emerging technologies like quantum computers, advanced semiconductor manufacturing equipment, and high-temperature coatings, which the EU and its member states wished to regulate despite a lack of consensus in the Wassenaar Arrangement due to objections from certain member states. This marks a strategic shift, with the EU implementing controls based on its own security assessments when multilateral progress stalls.

=== International regimes ===
There are several international arrangements among countries which seek to harmonize lists of dual-use (and military) technologies to control. These include the Nuclear Suppliers Group, the Australia Group, which looks at chemical and biological technologies, the Missile Technology Control Regime, which covers delivery systems for weapons of mass destruction, and the Wassenaar Arrangement, which covers conventional arms and dual-use technologies.

== See also ==
- General-purpose technology
- Treaty on the Non-Proliferation of Nuclear Weapons
