= Sten Lundbo =

Norwegian Diplomat

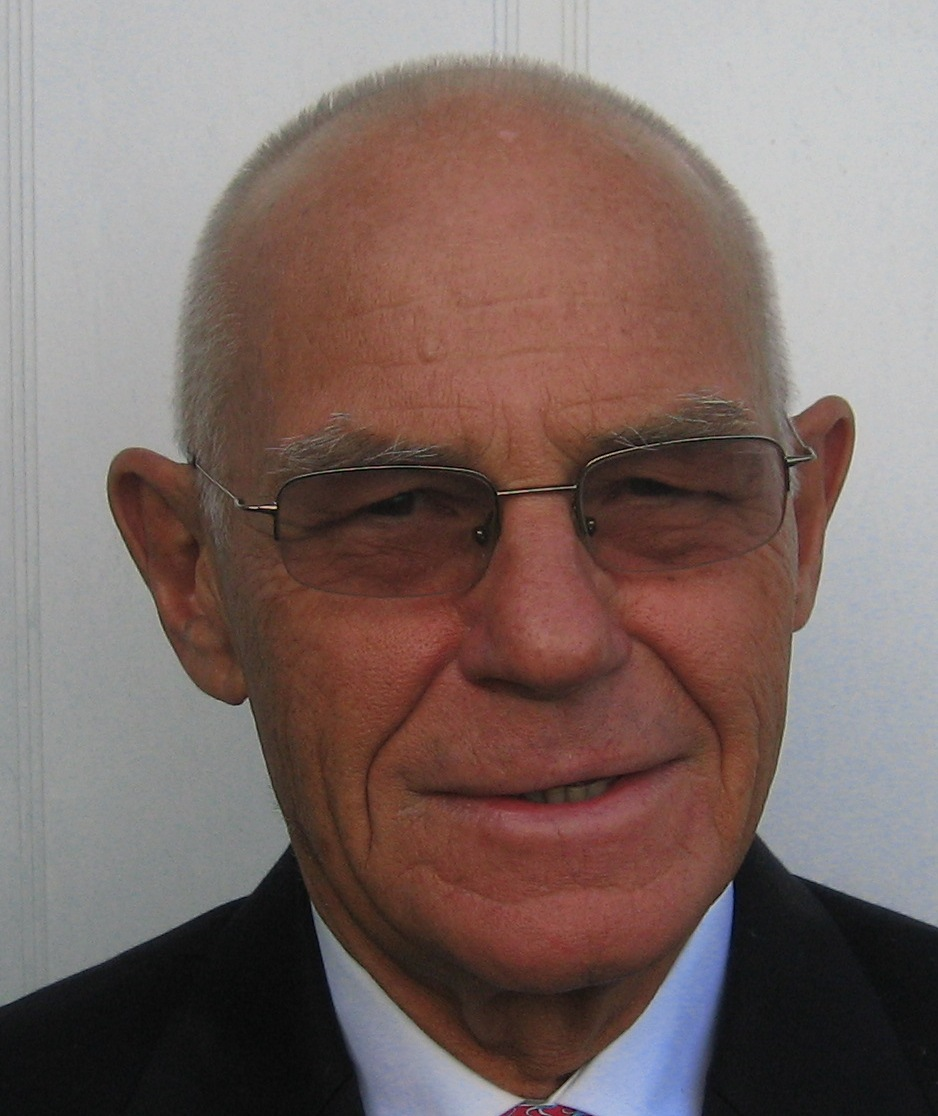
Ambassador Sten Lundbo

Sten Fredrik Lundbo (born 18 November 1940 in Bergen) is a Norwegian diplomat and was Ambassador to the Council of Europe in Strasbourg, France 1995 - 2000 and to the Republic of Poland 2000 - 2005.

== Education ==
Lundbo graduated with an MA in international economics from the Norwegian School of Economics in 1967.

== Career and assignments ==
Sten Fredrik Lundbo worked as a diplomat for the Norwegian Ministry of Foreign Affairs during the period 1967 - 2005. Lundbo's first postings were to the Embassies in Bangkok (1969–72) and Paris (1972–75). He was Director at the Ministry of Foreign Ministry 1989-1995. For the last ten years of his career he was an ambassador, firstly to the Council of Europe in Strasbourg (1995 - 2000) and thereafter in Warsaw (2000 - 2005).

Lundbo also served as Counsellor (1986 - 1986) and Minister Counsellor/Deputy Permanent Representative (1986–89) at Norwegian Delegation to the United Nations and other international organizations in Geneva

=== International assignments ===
- Member of the UN Group of Governmental Experts on the Relationship between Disarmament and Development 1978-1981.
- Chairman of the Missile Technology Control Regime (MTCR) 1992-1993. At the annual meeting in Oslo in July 1992, chaired by Sten Lundbo, it was agreed to expand the scope of the MTCR to include nonproliferation of unmanned aerial vehicles (UAVs) for all weapons of mass destruction (nuclear, chemical and biological weapons).
- Chairman of the Working Group on Guidelines 1993-1995 that led to the establishment i 1996 of the Wassenaar Arrangement Export Controls for Conventional Arms and Dual-use Goods and Technologies
- Chairman of the Council of Europe's rapporteur group for cooperation with the EU from 1996 to 2000.
- Member of the Governing Council of the Council of Europe Development Bank in Paris 1995-2000.

== Awards ==
- 1996 appointed Knight of the 1st class of St. Olav
- 2000 appointed commander of Royal Norwegian Order of Merit

Sten Lundbo is also awarded the following foreign orders:

- 1973 The Thai Order of the White Elephant
- 1975 The French Order of Merit (France).
- 1994 Commander of the Order of the Lion of Finland
- 1995 In November 1995 Lundbo received a Certificate of Appreciation, signed by the 63rd United States Secretary of State, Mr. Warren Christopher for his «contributions and leadership in advancing international cooperation to control the spread of armaments and sensitive dual-use goods and technologies».
- 1996 Commander Cross of the Order of Merit of the Republic of Hungary
- 2003 Commander with star of Order of Merit of the Republic of Poland
