= Export of cryptography =

Transfer of cryptography technology from one country to another

The export of cryptography is the transfer from one country to another of devices and technology related to cryptography.

In the early days of the Cold War, the United States and its allies developed an elaborate series of export control regulations designed to prevent a wide range of Western technology from falling into the hands of others, particularly the Eastern bloc. All export of technology classed as 'critical' required a license. CoCom was organized to coordinate Western export controls.

Many countries, notably those participating in the Wassenaar Arrangement, introduced restrictions. The Wassenaar restrictions were largely loosened in the late 2010s.

== See also ==
- Crypto wars
- Export of cryptography from the United States
- Restrictions on the import of cryptography
