= Export Management and Compliance Program =

An Export Management and Compliance Program (EMCP) is required by the U.S. Government to ensure that companies comply with export control policy for dual-use commodities, software, and technology. The policies and regulations are intended to enhance national security; as well as limiting the proliferation of weapons of mass destruction. If the regulations are not followed, heavy fines can be levied against the company. Individuals involved at all levels can also be penalized with fines, and imprisonment.

The U.S. Department of Commerce Bureau of Industry and Security (BIS) publishes a compliance guideline to help companies set up their Export Management & Compliance Program (EMCP) tailored to their own needs. The manual outlines 9 key elements.

1. Management Commitment
2. Risk Assessment
3. A Written EMCP
4. Compliance Training
5. Cradle to Grave Export Compliance Security & Screening
6. Recordkeeping
7. Audits/Assessments
8. Reporting & Escalation
9. Corrective Action

The BIS also publishes a self-audit tool to help companies evaluate their EMCP as would be expected by an outside audit.

== See also ==
- Denied Trade Screening
