= Coordinating Committee for Multilateral Export Controls =

Cold War embargo of Eastern Bloc states

The Coordinating Committee for Multilateral Export Controls (CoCom) was established in 1949 at the beginning of the Cold War to coordinate controls on exports from Western Bloc countries to the Soviet Union and its allies. Operating through informal consensus, CoCom maintained extensive control lists covering arms, nuclear materials, and dual-use technologies. However, CoCom faced criticism for weak enforcement and inconsistent application among member states. CoCom officially disbanded on March 31, 1994. However, many of its export restrictions remained in effect among member nations until they were formally replaced by the Wassenaar Arrangement in 1996. CoCom's legacy continues to influence contemporary export control regimes, highlighting its enduring relevance in nonproliferation and technology policy.

== Origins and historical context ==
CoCom originated from the tense geopolitical atmosphere following World War II, as Western nations grew increasingly wary of advanced technology potentially reaching the Soviet Bloc. This concern spurred efforts to collaborate on limiting technology transfers to communist states. Many of these concerns stemmed from America’s substantial technological investment in Japan during the 1930s, which helped Japan build East Asian industrial power ahead of WWII. As Japan grew to one of the U.S.'s primary adversaries in the World War II, many policymakers thus felt these policies were necessary to prevent the growth of powers challenging U.S. dominance. Thus, in response to the Soviet Union’s first nuclear test in 1949, the United States, United Kingdom, and France pursued confidential discussions to lay the groundwork for coordinated communist bloc export embargoes. These proposed restrictions were part of the broader Cold War strategy of containment, a tactic that aimed to prevent the Soviet Union from gaining access to industrial and computing technologies that would support its greater military and economic goals. These discussions resulted in a covert “gentlemen’s agreement” establishing CoCom in late 1949, with operations beginning in early 1950. CoCom was never formalized by treaty and operated informally, relying on unanimous consent for decisions, which limited its enforceability. Consequently, the U.S. enacted the Battle Act in 1951 to encourage participation, threatening to cut aid to allies that traded with communist nations. This attempt to steer the agenda fell short, as the relative warming of diplomatic relations through detente, coupled with the rapidly expanding economies of Europe and Japan becoming more intertwined with Eastern Europe, increased pressure on the United States to ease CoCom restrictions during the 1960s and 70s.

From the perspective of the Communist Bloc, CoCom was viewed as a discriminatory barrier to peaceful technology exchange. Theft as a means of technology transfer began to take place alongside limited technology transfers allowed to take place. However, this held significant disadvantages for the Soviets, as users were disconnected from Western manufacturers, and documentation of hardware was often unreliable. Thus, there were many within the Western bloc that felt that CoCom restrictions should be relaxed, in order to encourage reforms and promote peace. American computer scientist John McCarthy argued that the West needed to sell the Soviet regime on the advantages of rejoining the global order—through which Western technologies would be useful.

In the 1980s, renewed concerns about Soviet technological gains and competitive pressures in global markets revived interest in CoCom. With the United States facing more global technological development competition, European nations questioned the strict export restrictions and often lax enforcement, criticizing the U.S.-driven trade limitations as inconsistent and politically motivated. These concerns reinvigorated discussions of CoCom as a vital tool for controlling technology access to the Soviets and their allies, prompting meetings throughout the 1980s that reaffirmed member commitments to the CoCom. Nearly all countries in NATO joined CoCom by the late 1980s, and CoCom expanded its operations to add military advisors to advise on certain technologies and tighten licensing and enforcement measures. These initiatives laid the foundation for enhancing the reliability and effectiveness of the CoCom organization.

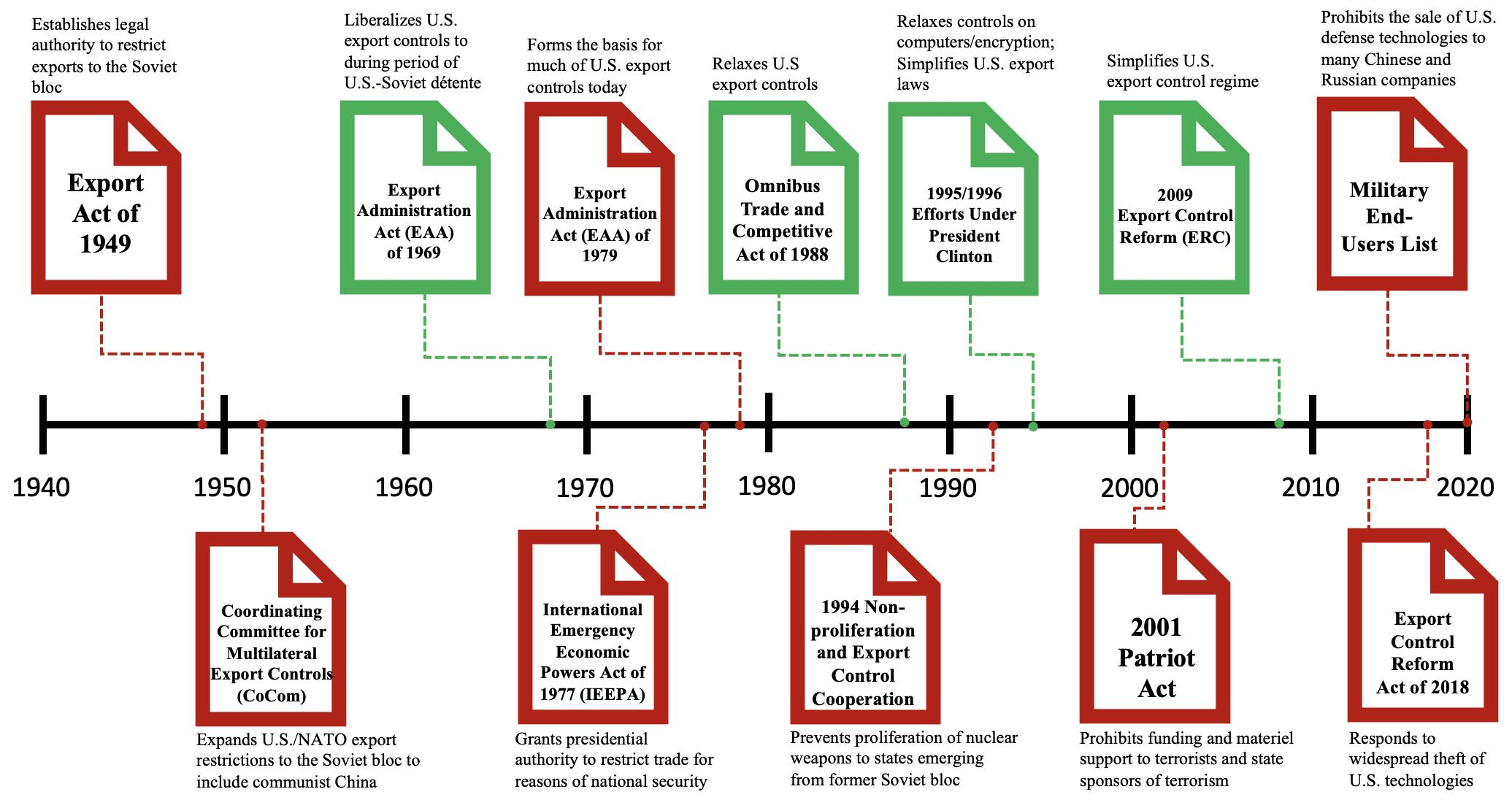
Timeline of most substantial changes and revisions to U.S. export controls from 1949 to 2020. Key: Red = Legislation that primarily places restrictions on U.S. exports; Green = Legislation that primarily relaxes restrictions on U.S. exports. This timeline, created by Zach Weinberg, highlights the most substantial changes and revisions to U.S. export controls from 1949 to 2020, however, it is not an exhaustive list of all U.S. export control laws.

== Membership ==
In its final years, CoCom had 17 member states:

- Australia
- Belgium
- Canada
- Denmark
- France
- Germany
- Greece
- Italy
- Japan
- Luxembourg
- Netherlands
- Norway
- Portugal
- Spain
- Turkey
- United Kingdom
- United States

Despite being neutral, Switzerland joined the CoCom sanctions against the Eastern bloc countries; see Hotz-Linder-Agreement.

=== Laws and regulations ===
In the United States, CoCom compliance was implemented via multiple statutes authorizing presidential export controls, including the Export Control Act of 1949, the Export Administration Act of 1969, the Export Administration Act of 1979, the Arms Export Control Act (AECA), the Trading with the Enemy Act, and the International Emergency Economic Powers Act, among others. Many of these statutes encouraged the coordination of controls with allies. However, U.S. policies frequently exceeded CoCom’s collective controls, reinforcing American leadership but also creating friction with allies. The Department of State and the Department of Commerce administered these coordinated controls via the Export Administration Regulations (EAR) and the International Traffic in Arms Regulations (ITAR).

== Effectiveness and impact ==
CoCom’s export control lists were elaborate, specific, and systematically organized. CoCom had three categories of export controls: the Nuclear List—spanning uranium enrichment systems and nuclear reactor components; the International Munitions List—including guided missiles, advanced avionics, and other strategic military systems; and the Industrial List—containing dual-use items such as supercomputers and semiconductors. These lists were updated regularly—in 1954, 1958, 1961, 1964, 1967, 1971, and 1974-1975—to reflect evolving geopolitical dynamics between CoCom constituents and the USSR. President George H.W. Bush’s successful proposal to eliminate a significant number of industrial and dual-use CoCom export controls following the fall of the Berlin Wall and diminishing Soviet influence in Eastern Europe reflects CoCom’s adaptability. Moreover, in 1992, CoCom members collectively agreed to expand membership to the former USSR. The longevity of CoCom—lasting 30 years despite military risks that threatened its abolition—is also notable.

Yet enforcement was weak and export control lists were often ambiguous. First, with only 14 staff in the 1980s, CoCom lacked robust inspection or sanction mechanisms. Disagreements over what constituted “dual-use” technology created ambiguity, causing poor export control enforcement. Second, CoCom not only lacked large fines for violators but was also unable to impose sanctions against them. Third, there were frequent complaints about American hypocrisy within CoCom—using export control mechanisms to delay competitors’ deals while greenlighting similar U.S. exports. European countries pointed out that since the U.S. controlled the reexport licensing system, American corporations could evade U.S. credit restrictions by exporting through European subsidiaries while simultaneously delaying French exports, giving American corporations a commercial advantage. Specifically, non-American CoCom members felt that U.S. policies on East-West technology transfers were both volatile and politically driven, pointing to President Carter’s reversal of a denied export license for Sperry-Univac, an American corporation, to the Soviet Union—potentially because the U.S. sought a competitive advantage after deterring non-American CoCom members from pursuing similar deals.

Fourth, the Industrial List included “dual-use” items—goods, services, and technologies that could be deployed for both commercial and military use; however, the definition of what qualifies as “dual-use” became increasingly ambiguous. For examples, American companies exporting civilian telecommunications satellites relied upon Chinese military rockets, raising concerns about how technology transfers could enhance China’s missile capabilities. Much of the opposition against CoCom revolved around whether market competition was a sufficient deterrent against exporting high-tech items to adversaries. Many European officials believed that potential competition and the risk of losing a comparative advantage would be a sufficient safeguard against Western technology transfers to the Soviets. Ultimately, Cold War's end weakened the rationale for CoCom, leading to its disbandment.

== Soviet Union's reception and resistance ==
For the most part, the Soviet Union viewed CoCom not merely as a Western mechanism to restrict trade but also as a strategic tool employed by the West to impede the USSR's technological and economic development. From the Soviet standpoint, CoCom was an extension of Cold War hostilities. While never formally acknowledged in public by the Soviet leadership, CoCom was frequently denounced in internal party discussion and through state-aligned media as an economic warfare mechanism designed to stunt socialist development and prove capitalist technological superiority.

Throughout the Cold War, the Soviet Union systematically tried to undermine export controls enforced by CoCom. The Soviet Union circumvented them primarily through Soviet intelligence agencies, particularly the KGB and GRU. By the early 1980s, the KGB and GRU had deployed thousands of agents, called "technology collection officers", across Western Europe and the United States, to gain access to restricted technology through establishing "dummy" corporations—fake businesses that were intermediaries for purchasing technology—and conducting "territorial diversions", which the U.S. intelligence community referred to as the process of acquiring sensitive U.S. technology and then rerouting it through neutral or CoCom-member countries such as Switzerland and Sweden where export controls were relatively more lenient. According to a 1982 CIA report, the USSR obtained approximately 70% of military-relevant Western technologies through the aforementioned intelligence channels; the rest were secured through legal trade, student exchanges, and open-source scientific literature.

The Soviet procurement networks were deeply sophisticated, reflected in the USSR's successful acquisition of high-value U.S. systems such as the Digital Equipment Corporation's VAX 11/782 computer and the Perkin-Elmer Micralign 200. For instance, with the VAX 11/782, Soviet intelligence officers implemented a complex route spanning South Africa, West Germany, and Sweden before U.S. authorities intervened to address the loophole in CoCom's export controls. Despite Soviet efforts to resist CoCom exports, internal Soviet discussions recognized the adaptive nature of CoCom—reflected in recurring updates in the export control lists and U.S. efforts to restrict third-country reexports. Soviet efforts to resist CoCom, however, were ultimately covert—rarely addressing CoCom in international forums—potentially due to the secretive nature of its acquisition methods of U.S. technology.

While the Soviet Union internally framed CoCom as a Western strategy of economic warfare, scholars argue that core problems within the Soviet system itself played a more critical role in its technological stagnation—its statist models of development were incompatible with informationalization; there was an ideological distortion of science; and dependency on Western technology frequently emerged as a result of short-sighted policy decisions.

== Violations ==
Toshiba Machine Company of Japan and Kongsberg Group of Norway supplied eight CNC propeller milling machines to the Soviet Union between 1982 and 1984, an action that violated the CoCom regulations. The United States' position is that this greatly improved the ability of Soviet submarines to evade detection. The Japanese government and U.S. House of Representatives then moved to sanction Toshiba and ban imports of Toshiba products into the U.S. military stores.

In a related case, French machine tool company Forest-Liné (later acquired by Fives Group) exported tens of millions of dollars' worth of sophisticated milling machinery to the Soviet Union, allowing the Soviets to fabricate aircraft fuselages and turbine blades for high-performance jet engines. This information came to light during an investigation by the Norwegian police into the Toshiba-Kongsberg scandal. Subsequently, four top Forest-Liné executives were arrested.

== Legacy ==
=== Controversies and criticism ===
CoCom’s legacy remains a subject of spirited debate and controversy. Proponents contend that it was indispensable for Western security, as it prevented advanced “critical” technologies from falling into Soviet hands and thereby bolstered the West’s strategic edge. Critics, however, argue that CoCom’s controls were only partly effective, citing numerous breaches–with one British parliamentary review labeling the incidents a “horror story” of illegal exports–which enabled Eastern Bloc nations to acquire Western equipment despite the embargo. Moreover, the regime generated diplomatic strains among allies; several partners resented Washington’s dominance and perceived double standards – exemplified by the U.S. attempt to embargo European equipment for a Siberian gas pipeline in the early 1980s, a move that backfired when it emerged that American firms had supplied similar equipment themselves. By the early 1990s, CoCom was widely regarded as an outdated Cold War relic that hindered East–West economic engagement, with its eventual disbandment driven by a desire to integrate former adversaries (like Russia) into global markets and ease trans-Atlantic frictions. In the 21st century, while some analysts advocate for a modern, CoCom-like coalition to restrict China’s access to sensitive technology, others caution that reviving a Cold War–style embargo system would likely prove ineffective or even counterproductive in today’s interconnected global economy.

CoCom’s stringent export controls also drew criticism from outside the Western alliance for allegedly stifling broader technological progress. Eastern Bloc leaders contended that the sweeping restrictions – especially those on dual-use technologies under CoCom’s extensive Industrial List – impeded their economic and scientific development. Soviet officials even characterized CoCom as an instrument of Western dominance; in mid-1989, Mikhail Gorbachev complained that East–West relations had been “bled white by CoCom,” calling many of its remaining high-tech bans “utterly ridiculous” as Cold War tensions eased. Likewise, many developing countries in the Global South (notably members of the Non-Aligned Movement) denounced CoCom as a form of “technological imperialism” aimed at preserving the West’s industrial and strategic supremacy. Representatives from these nations argued that such export-control regimes functioned as a discriminatory barrier to equitable development, noting that “undue restrictions” on the transfer of materials and know-how for peaceful purposes hampered their growth.

=== Successor export control regimes ===
Wassenaar Arrangement

CoCom shaped the foundational principles for modern multilateral export-control regimes. Its practices informed successor frameworks such as the Wassenaar Arrangement, the Missile Technology Control Regime, and contemporary U.S. extraterritorial export controls.

In fact, the Wassenaar Arrangement was directly drawn from the ashes of CoCom, as it was established to address the security environment post-Cold War, and tackle the controlling exports of conventional arms and dual-use goods and technologies. Rather than targeting specific countries or relying on legally binding provisions, however, Wassenaar relies on voluntary information-sharing guidelines and lacks CoCom’s ability to veto member state exports.

The post-CoCom era has also introduced new challenges from globalization and digital technology proliferation, complicating traditional embargoes and export controls. These issues are particularly relevant with enforceable US advanced technology export controls focusing on China, which is much more integrated into the global economy today than the Soviet Union ever was. Thus, contemporary U.S. export controls are more unilateral in nature, relying on comprehensive regulations that not only prohibit direct exports but also leverage globalization to control foreign-produced items incorporating U.S. technology. Geopolitically, these controls aim to impede China's progress in critical high-tech sectors, bolstering U.S. technological leadership and addressing concerns about Chinese military-civil fusion.

The biggest difference between CoCom and current U.S. export controls lies in enforcement mechanisms. Instead of relying on collective enforcement and potentially uneven member nation export control applications, modern U.S. policies centralize export control authority under the Department of Commerce’ Bureau of Industry and Security (BIS). BIS actively monitors compliance and has the authority to unilaterally enforce regulations and penalize violators. BIS’ jurisdiction extends extraterritorially via the Foreign Direct Product Rule (FDPR), which allows the government to limit the sale of foreign-made goods that use U.S. technology.

=== GPS "CoCom limits" ===
In GPS technology, the term "CoCom Limits" also refers to a limit placed on GPS receivers that limits functionality when the device calculates that it is moving faster than 1,000 knots (510 m/s) and/or at an altitude higher than 18,000 m (59,000 ft). This was intended to prevent the use of GPS in intercontinental ballistic missile-like applications.

Some manufacturers apply this limit only when both speed and altitude limits are reached, while other manufacturers disable tracking when either limit is reached. In the latter case, this causes some devices to refuse to operate in very-high-altitude balloons.

The Missile Technology Control Regime's Technical Annex, clause 11.A.3, includes a speed limit on GNSS receivers, set at 600 m/s.

== See also ==
- Export control
- Multilateral export control regime
- International Traffic in Arms Regulations
- Arms Export Control Act
- Defense Security Cooperation Agency
- Export Administration Regulations
- John Barron KGB Today: The Hidden Hand, 1983.
