= Multilateral export control regime =

International arms and weapons control agreement

A multilateral export control regime is an informal group of like-minded supplier countries that seek to contribute to the non-proliferation of weapons of mass destruction, delivery systems, and advanced conventional weapons through national implementation of guidelines and control lists for exports. For a chart of national membership in different regimes, see the SIPRI Yearbook chapter on "Transfer controls".

There are currently four such regimes:

- The Wassenaar Arrangement (WA) on Export Controls for Conventional Arms and Dual-Use Goods and Technologies
- The Nuclear Suppliers Group (NSG), for the control of nuclear and nuclear-related technology
- The Australia Group (AG) for the control of chemical and biological technology that could be weaponized
- The Missile Technology Control Regime (MTCR) for the control of rockets and other aerial vehicles capable of delivering weapons of mass destruction

While not formally an export control regime, the Zangger Committee has developed guidance on nuclear export restrictions required by the Non-Proliferation Treaty (NPT).

Participating states of all four regimes

The following 30 countries are members of all of the above four regimes:

- Argentina
- Australia
- Austria
- Belgium
- Bulgaria
- Canada
- Czech Republic
- Denmark
- Finland
- France
- Germany
- Greece
- Hungary
- Ireland
- Italy
- Japan
- Luxembourg
- Netherlands
- New Zealand
- Norway
- Poland
- Portugal
- South Korea
- Spain
- Sweden
- Switzerland
- Turkey
- Ukraine
- United Kingdom
- United States

The following 13 countries are members of at least three of these regimes:

- Croatia (AG, NSG, WA)
- Estonia (AG, NSG, WA)
- Iceland (AG, MTCR, NSG)
- India (AG, MTCR, WA)
- Latvia (AG, NSG, WA)
- Lithuania (AG, NSG, WA)
- Malta (AG, NSG, WA)
- Mexico (AG, NSG, WA)
- Romania (AG, NSG, WA)
- Russia (MTCR, NSG, WA)
- Slovakia (AG, NSG, WA)
- Slovenia (AG, NSG, WA)
- South Africa (MTCR, NSG, WA)

The following two countries are members of at least two of these regimes:

- Brazil (MTCR, NSG)
- Cyprus (AG, NSG)

The following five countries and political entities are members of at least one of these regimes:

- Belarus (NSG)
- China (NSG)
- Kazakhstan (NSG)
- Serbia (NSG)
- European Union (AG)
