= Nuclear Suppliers Group =

Multilateral export control regime

- Logo of the NSG

- NSG members
- Abbreviation: NSG
- Formation: 1974; 52 years ago
- Purpose: Non-proliferation of nuclear weapons; controlling transfer of nuclear energy
- Members: See list
- Official languages: English, French, German, Spanish
- Chair: Gustavo Zlauvinen (Argentina)
- Website: nuclearsuppliersgroup.org

The Nuclear Suppliers Group (NSG) is a multilateral export control regime and a group of nuclear supplier countries that seek to contribute to the non-proliferation of nuclear weapons through the implementation of two sets of guidelines for nuclear exports and nuclear-related exports.

== History ==
The NSG was founded in response to India's first nuclear weapon test in May 1974. It first met in November 1975. The test demonstrated that certain non-weapons specific nuclear technology could be readily turned to weapons development. Nations already signatories of the Nuclear Non-Proliferation Treaty (NPT) saw the need to further limit the export of nuclear equipment, materials or technology. Another benefit was that non-NPT and non-Zangger Committee nations, then specifically France, could be brought in.

A series of meetings in London from 1975 to 1978 resulted in agreements on the guidelines for export; these were published as INFCIRC/254 (essentially the Zangger "Trigger List") by the International Atomic Energy Agency. Listed items could only be exported to non-nuclear states if certain International Atomic Energy Agency safeguards were agreed to or if exceptional circumstances relating to safety existed.

The name of the "London Club" was due to the series of meetings in London. It has also been referred to as the London Group, or the London Suppliers Group.

The NSG did not meet again until 1991. The "Trigger List" remained unchanged until 1991, although the Zangger list was regularly updated. The revelations about the Iraqi weapons program following the first Gulf War led to a tightening of the export of so-called dual-use equipment. At the first meeting since 1978, held at the Hague in March 1991, the twenty-six participating governments agreed to the changes, which were published as the "Dual-use List" in 1992, and also to the extension of the original list to more closely match the up-to-date Zangger list.

== Participating governments ==
Initially the NSG had seven participating governments: Canada, West Germany, France, Japan, the Soviet Union, the United Kingdom, and the United States. In 1976–77, participation was expanded to fifteen with the admittance of Belgium, Czechoslovakia, East Germany, Italy, the Netherlands, Poland, Sweden, and Switzerland. Germany was reunited in 1990 while Czechoslovakia broke up into the Czech Republic and Slovakia in 1993. Twelve more nations joined up to 1990. Following the collapse of the Soviet Union a number of former republics were given observer status as a stage towards future membership. China became a participating government in 2004. The European Commission and the Zangger Committee Chair participate as observers. The NSG Chair for 2024–2025 is South Africa.

The 48 participating governments and their accession date, as of 2022:

- Argentina(1994)
- Australia(1978)
- Austria(1991)
- Belarus(2000)
- Belgium(1978)
- Brazil(1996)
- Bulgaria(1984)
- Canada(1974)
- China(2004)
- Croatia(2005)
- Cyprus(2000)
- Czech Republic(1978*)
- Denmark(1984)
- Estonia(2004)
- Finland(1980)
- France(1974)
- Germany(1974)
- Greece(1984)
- Hungary(1985)
- Iceland(2009)
- Ireland(1984)
- Italy(1978)
- Japan(1974)
- Kazakhstan(2002)
- Latvia(1997)
- Lithuania(2004)
- Luxembourg(1984)
- Malta(2004)
- Mexico(2012)
- Netherlands(1978)
- New Zealand(1994)
- Norway(1989)
- Poland(1978)
- Portugal(1986)
- Romania(1990)
- Russia(1974)
- Serbia(2013)
- Slovakia(1978*)
- Slovenia(2000)
- South Africa(1995)
- South Korea(1995)
- Spain(1988)
- Sweden(1978)
- Switzerland(1978)
- Turkey(2000)
- Ukraine(1996)
- United Kingdom(1974)
- United States(1974)

* Czechoslovakia separated into the Czech Republic and Slovakia – participation date 5 Mar 1993.

== Candidates ==
=== Chile ===
Chile has been candidate for the Nuclear Suppliers Group since 2015 as part of its national commitments with the UNSC resolution 1540 of 2004. In its 2017 report to UN about prevention of arms proliferation has presented a National Plan of Action (2017–2021) that includes as targets membership to the Nuclear Suppliers Group and the Wassenaar Arrangement.

=== India ===
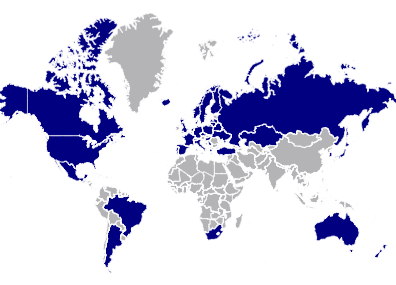
Countries supporting NSG membership for India

Following the entry into force of the NPT, India had been opposed to the NSG as an imposition of control from those states which already possessed nuclear technology. This view began to shift in the 2000s as India gained confidence in its status as a nuclear state and relations warmed with the U.S. During a state visit to India in November 2010, U.S. President Barack Obama announced U.S. support for India's participation in the Nuclear Suppliers Group, the Wassenaar Arrangement, the Australia Group and the Missile Technology Control Regime, "in a phased manner," and to encourage the evolution of regime participation criteria to that end, "consistent with maintaining the core principles of these regimes."

During a visit to India in December 2010, French President Sarkozy expressed his country's backing for India's inclusion in the Nuclear Suppliers Group. The United Kingdom has for a long time been a supporter of India's inclusion. During a Republic Day visit to India in January 2015, Obama said that India was ready for membership. Russian president Vladimir Putin has offered unconditional support for India's entry. Switzerland announced its backing of India's participation in the group on 6 June 2016 during Prime Minister Narendra Modi's visit to Geneva. Obama reiterated U.S. support for India's membership on 8 June 2016 during Modi's visit to Washington DC. Japan has expressed support for India's bid for accession.

China is opposing India's accession, citing Pakistan's non-admission to the exclusive group. Other countries opposing Indian membership on the basis of the NPT non-signatory status of India included New Zealand, Ireland and Austria.

In June 2016, India got crucial support from Mexico in its bid to become a participant ahead of a plenary meeting of the 48-nation bloc whose members are allowed to trade in and export nuclear technology. On 17 June, British Prime Minister David Cameron had assured Modi of the UK's "firm support" for India's membership bid. In an interview on 18 June, Putin said that he was 'positive' about India's entry. On 20 June, Canada stated that NSG will be strengthened with India's presence. On 22 June France reiterated its support to India, and urged all the other 48 members of the NSG to allow entry for India. China remains opposed to Indian membership.

In July 2016, South Africa agreed to back India's entry. In August 2016, Turkey confirmed support for India's membership bid. On 4 September 2016, Australia reiterated its commitment to India's bid for membership just ahead of the G20 summit in Hangzhou, China. On 5 September 2016, Modi thanked Argentina for backing India's bid.

On 17 October 2016, following the BRICS summit in Benaulim, Goa, Brazil officially backed India's bid for membership. On 26 October 2016, Prime Minister Key of New Zealand stated that "New Zealand would continue to contribute constructively to the process currently underway in the NSG to consider India's membership." Poland and Cyprus backed India's bid in April 2017. Germany reaffirmed India's membership bid in May 2017. Switzerland also showed support, Swiss Foreign Ministry spokesperson Pierre-Alain Eltschinger saying that "We support India's application for participation in the NSG and acknowledge India's support to global non-proliferation efforts." During the 15th RIC (Russia, India, China) foreign ministerial meeting Russia said it continues to support India’s entry. Describing India as a leading power in the Indo-Pacific region, Washington's envoy to New Delhi Kenneth Juster reaffirmed support for India’s bid in January 2018. In the joint press statement of an India–Nordic countries summit, the Nordic countries welcomed India’s application for membership and reaffirmed their commitment to work constructively within the Group with the aim of reaching a positive outcome at the earliest opportunity in April 2018. On 16 April 2018 Germany supported India's bid for membership saying that its inclusion will boost the global export control system. Reaffirming their commitment to global non-proliferation efforts, PM Conte reiterated Italy's support to India's intensified engagement for admission in Oct 2018 during the 24th edition of the India-Italy Technology Summit. In 2019 China cited a "lack of consensus" among NSG members regarding its reported opposition to Indian participation.

In 2024, Mark Hibbs reported for Arms Control Today that "a number of significant supplier states in Europe, North America, and the Asia-Pacific region do not support admitting India or Pakistan now, even though some of these governments have expressed official support in principle for India’s participation." In the case of India, this reportedly owed to concerns regarding "like-mindedness" that have arisen from difficulties working with India in other export control regimes India joined from 2016-2018. He also stated, however, that China was "at the fulcrum" of whether either would be admitted, with an agreement between India and China being a precondition to either under any circumstances.

=== Namibia ===
Namibia applied for NSG membership in 2016.

=== Pakistan ===
Pakistan applied for participation on 19 May 2016. Pakistan has stressed the need for NSG to adopt a non-discriminatory criteria-based approach for NSG membership of the countries, which have never been party to the nuclear Non-Proliferation Treaty (NPT).

Pakistan's membership has reportedly been supported by Turkey and China. Pakistan has launched a major lobbying campaign to get additional support on its NSG membership. The US has not publicly opposed Pakistan, the US State Department's Spokesperson Mark Toner commented in May 2016: “They have made public their interest, and certainly any country can submit its application for membership. And we’ll consider [it] based on a consensus decision.” Subsequently, NSG initiated discussions on the ‘Technical, Legal, and Political aspects of participation of non-NPT states in the NSG’ in the Seoul Plenary in June 2017. China has also tied the Indian bid to Pakistan's bid, blocking the former's entry on the basis that If India can be admitted without signing the NPT, then the same process should allow Pakistan entry.

In 2004, the illicit procurement network run by Pakistani scientist AQ Khan, who led Pakistan's uranium enrichment program, was exposed. This network trafficked in nuclear and dual-use goods and supported nuclear weapons programs in Iran, Libya and North Korea as well as Pakistan itself, and included individuals and entities from over 30 countries. In 2004, Pakistan also promulgated an Export Control Act on Goods, Technologies, Materials and Equipment related to Nuclear and Biological Weapons and their Delivery Systems and published Export Control Lists in 2005, which have been frequently updated. The United States on 26 March 2018 sanctioned seven Pakistani firms for nuclear proliferation, potentially hurting its ambitions of NSG membership.

As Arms Control Today reported in 2024 (see above), a number of "significant supplier states" of the NSG also do not support Pakistan's entry and the group "feels no pressure" from China to "force the pace of decision-making". In the case of Pakistan, the country lacks a track record of involvement in comparable export control regimes, and the topic of Pakistan's continued nuclear trade with Chinese suppliers remains a significant issue.

=== Jordan ===
Jordan has been a candidate since 2017, when its cabinet decided to join the group.

== Role in India-US nuclear agreement ==
In July 2006, the United States Congress amended U.S. law to accommodate civilian nuclear trade with India. A meeting of NSG participating governments on 21–22 August 2008 on an India-specific exemption to the Guidelines was inconclusive. Several participating governments, including Austria, Switzerland, Norway, Ireland, and New Zealand, expressed reservations about the lack of conditions in the proposed exemption. In another meeting on 6 September 2008, the NSG participating governments agreed to grant India a "clean waiver" from its existing rules, which forbid nuclear trade with a country which has not signed the Nuclear Non-Proliferation Treaty (NPT). The NSG's decision came after three days of intense U.S. diplomacy. The approval was based on a formal pledge by India stating that it would not share sensitive nuclear technology or material with others and would uphold its voluntary moratorium on testing nuclear weapons. The pledge was contained in a crucial statement issued during the NSG meeting by India outlining the country's disarmament and nonproliferation policies.
