= Wassenaar Arrangement =

1996 multilateral export control regime

Participating states of the Wassenaar Arrangement

The Wassenaar Arrangement on Export Controls for Conventional Arms and Dual-Use Goods and Technologies, also known simply as the Wassenaar Arrangement, is a multilateral export control regime governing the international transfer of conventional arms and dual-use goods and technologies. It was established on 12 July 1996 in Wassenaar, Netherlands, as the successor to the Cold War–era Coordinating Committee for Multilateral Export Controls (CoCom), which restricted certain goods to the Eastern Bloc.

The Wassenaar Arrangement was established to "contribute to regional and international security and stability by promoting transparency and greater responsibility" among participating states, which coordinate their national policies to ensure certain technologies are not transferred or otherwise diverted to countries that undermine these goals. There are 42 participating states, including many former Comecon (Warsaw Pact) countries such as Russia. A secretariat for administering the agreement is based in Vienna, Austria.

The Wassenaar Arrangement is considerably less strict than CoCom, focusing primarily on the transparency of national export control regimes and not granting veto power to individual members over organizational decisions; like CoCom, it is not a treaty and therefore not legally binding. Every six months, member countries voluntarily exchange information on deliveries of conventional arms to non-Wassenaar members that fall under eight broad weapons categories: battle tanks, armoured fighting vehicles, large-calibre artillery, military aircraft, military helicopters, warships, missiles or missile systems, and small arms and light weapons.

== Control lists ==
The outline of the arrangement is set out in a document entitled "Guidelines & Procedures, including the Initial Elements". The list of restricted technologies is broken into two parts, the "List of Dual-Use Goods and Technologies" (also known as the Basic List) and the "Munitions List". The Basic List is composed of ten categories based on increasing levels of sophistication:

- Category 1 – Special Materials and Related Equipment
- Category 2 – Materials Processing
- Category 3 – Electronics
- Category 4 – Computers
- Category 5 – Part 1 – Telecommunications
- Category 5 – Part 2 – Information Security
- Category 6 – Sensors and Lasers
- Category 7 – Navigation and Avionics
- Category 8 – Marine
- Category 9 – Aerospace and Propulsion

Basic List has two nested subsections—Sensitive and Very Sensitive. Items of the Very Sensitive List include materials for stealth technology—i.e., equipment that could be used for submarine detection, advanced radar, and jet engine technologies.

Within each of the categories, there are 5 types of controlled item. These are approximately as follows:

- A – Physical goods and components
- B – Plant, test equipment etc. for the production of the goods
- C – Materials typically from which the goods can be created
- D – Software used typically for the development, production or use of the goods
- E – Technology used typically for the development, production or use of the goods

The types of item B, C, D and E typically refer to the type A items, but there are many exceptions, e.g. some materials may be controlled, even though there is no specific good referred to.

The Wassenaar Arrangement List's categories are typically processed, and merged with other sources, e.g. Category 5.A.2 maps on to US ECCN 5A002, and EU control classification 5A002.

The Munitions List has 22 categories, which are not labeled.

In order for an item to be placed on the lists, member states must take into account the following criteria:

- Foreign availability outside participating states
- Ability to effectively control the export of the goods
- Ability to make a clear and objective specification of the item
- Controlled by another regime, such as the Australia Group, the Nuclear Suppliers Group, or the Missile Technology Control Regime

== Admission requirements ==
Admission requires states to:

- Be a producer or exporter of arms or sensitive industrial equipment
- Maintain non-proliferation policies and appropriate national policies, including adherence to:
  - Non-proliferation policies, such as (where applicable) the Nuclear Suppliers Group, the Missile Technology Control Regime, and the Australia Group
  - Treaty on the Non-Proliferation of Nuclear Weapons, the Biological Weapons Convention, the Chemical Weapons Convention and, where applicable, START I (including the Lisbon Protocol)
- Maintain fully effective export controls

The Arrangement is open on a global and non-discriminatory basis to prospective adherents that comply with the agreed criteria. Admission of new members requires the consensus of all members.

India joined as the 42nd participating state on 7 December 2017. "Wassenaar Arrangement participating states reviewed the progress of a number of current membership applications and agreed at the plenary meeting to admit India which will become the Arrangement's 42nd participating state as soon as the necessary procedural arrangements for joining the WA are completed", the grouping said in a statement. India's application was supported by Russia, the United States, France and Germany.

== 2013 amendments ==
In December 2013, the list of export restricted technologies was amended to include Internet-based surveillance systems. New technologies placed under the export control regime include "intrusion software"—software designed to defeat a computer or network's protective measures so as to extract data or information—as well as IP network surveillance systems.

The purpose of the amendments was to prevent Western technology companies from selling surveillance technology to governments known to abuse human rights. However, some technology companies have expressed concerns that the scope of the controls may be too broad, limiting security researchers' ability to identify and correct security vulnerabilities. Google and Facebook criticised the agreement for the restrictions it will place on activities like penetration testing, sharing information about threats, and bug bounty programs. They argue that the restrictions will weaken the security of participating nations and do little to curb threats from non-participant nations.

== "Wassenaar minus one" ==
During 2022 and 2023, a variety of proposals for modification to the listed items were proposed within Wassenaar, but were not accepted. Several states made unilateral legislation, rather than obtaining harmonisation through the Arrangement, including:

- Spain for quantum computers containing more than 34 qubits and error rates below a certain controlled NOT gate error threshold, along with restrictions for quantum computers with more qubits and higher error rates, and cryo-computing technologies
- Netherlands for equipment for manufacturing advanced-process-node semiconductors
- US for AI chips and technology, and lasers and cameras associated with some types of additive manufacture

The corresponding proposals within WA were not accepted, due to objection from the Russian delegation. Only minor and editorial changes were universally accepted. At the time, Russia faced international sanctions over its invasion of Ukraine.

Consequently, in mid 2024 and later, many Wassenaar nations have implemented export controls corresponding to the unilateral legislation above. These include UK and Canada. These are classified as 'country specific', although there appears to be harmonisation of these 2024 controls across many advanced economies. The introduction of these controls caused surprise in some circles. Other nations largely harmonised their export controls over the course of late 2024 and 2025.

== Membership ==
The 42 states that have been participating since December 2017 are:

- Argentina
- Australia
- Austria
- Belgium
- Bulgaria
- Canada
- Croatia
- Czech Republic
- Denmark
- Estonia
- Finland
- France
- Germany
- Greece
- Hungary
- India
- Ireland
- Italy
- Japan
- Latvia
- Lithuania
- Luxembourg
- Malta
- Mexico
- Netherlands
- New Zealand
- Norway
- Poland
- Portugal
- Romania
- Russia
- Slovakia
- Slovenia
- South Africa
- South Korea
- Spain
- Sweden
- Switzerland
- Turkey
- Ukraine
- United Kingdom
- United States

– European Union member state. – NATO member.

=== Candidates ===
==== Chile ====
Chile has been candidate for Nuclear Suppliers Group and Wassenaar Arrangement since 2015 as part of its national commitments with the UNSC resolution 1540 of 2004. In its 2017 report to UN about prevention of arms proliferation has presented a National Plan of Action (2017–2021) that includes as targets membership to the Nuclear Suppliers Group and the Wassenaar Arrangement by 2021.

== See also ==
- Arms Export Control Act – United States law
- Defense Security Cooperation Agency – US military agency
- International Traffic in Arms Regulations – United States law preventing export of military technologies
