= Cryptography Law of the People's Republic of China =

The Cryptography Law of the People's Republic of China is the country's first comprehensive statue regulating cryptography. It was adopted on October 26, 2019, by The Standing Committee of the National People's Congress and took effect on January 1, 2020.

The law intends to regulate the application and administration of cryptography, promoting the development of cryptography, protect information security, safeguard national security and public interests and protect the rights of citizens and organizations.

== Classification ==
The law classifies cryptography into three categories.

- Core cryptography: Protects top-secret and higher-tier state secrets. It has the strictest controls of them three.
- Ordinary cryptography: Protects lower-tier state secrets. It's used by government bodies and critical systems.
- Commercial cryptography: Used to protect information that isn't a state secret, and is the category the public, businesses and the market can use. Individuals and organizations may use it.

== Enforcement ==
The State Cryptography Administration supervises cryptography work nationally, with local counterparts of the provincial level and below. The law sets out penalties, including fines, or even criminal liabity for serious violations such as illegally providing core and ordinary cryptography.
