= Restrictions on the import of cryptography =

A number of countries have attempted to restrict the import of cryptography tools.

== Rationale ==
Countries may wish to restrict import of cryptography technologies for a number of reasons:

- Imported cryptography may have backdoors or security holes (e.g. the FREAK vulnerability), intentional or not, which allows the country or group who created the backdoor technology, for example the National Security Agency (NSA), to spy on persons using the imported cryptography; therefore the use of cryptography is restricted to that which the government thinks is safe, or which it develops itself.
- Citizens can anonymously communicate with each other, preventing any external party from monitoring them.
- Encrypted transactions may impede external entities to control the conducting of business.
- Cryptography may sometimes increase levels of privacy within the country beyond what the government wishes.

== Status by country ==
The Electronic Privacy Information Center and Global Internet Liberty Campaign reports use a color code to indicate the level of restriction, with the following meanings:

- Green: No restriction
- Yellow: License required for importation
- Red: Total ban

Country	Status	Updated
Angola	Unknown	2000
Armenia	Green/Yellow	2000
Bahrain	Yellow	2008
Belarus	Red	2008
Brunei Darussalam	Yellow/Red	2000
Cambodia	Yellow	2008
Canada	Green	2015
China	Yellow	2008
Czech Republic	Green/Yellow	2008
Egypt	Yellow	2007
Ghana	Green	2008
Hong Kong	Green/Yellow	2008
Hungary	Green/Yellow	2008
India	Green/Yellow	2008
Iran	Yellow	2008
Iraq	Red	2000
Israel	Yellow	2008
Kazakhstan	Yellow	2008
Latvia	Yellow	2008
Lithuania	Yellow	2008
Malta	Yellow	2000
Moldova	Yellow	2008
Mongolia	Red	2000
Morocco	Yellow	2008
Myanmar (Burma)	Red	2008
Nepal	Unknown	2000
Nicaragua	Unknown	2000
North Korea	Unknown/Red	2008
Pakistan	Yellow	2008
Poland	Green/Yellow	2008
Romania	Green	1996 (Wassenaar)
Russia	Red	2008
Rwanda	Unknown	2008
Saudi Arabia	Green	2008
Singapore	Green	2008
South Africa	Green/Yellow	2008
South Korea	Yellow	2008
Tunisia	Yellow/Red	2008
Turkmenistan	Red	2000
Ukraine	Yellow	2007
Vietnam	Yellow	2008

== See also ==
- Code as speech
- Export of cryptography
