= Office of Export Enforcement =

Office of the United States Department of Commerce, Bureau of Industry and Security

Office of Export Enforcement (OEE)
Agency overview
- Jurisdiction: Federal government of the United States
- Headquarters: Washington, D.C.
- Agency executive: John Sonderman, Director
- Parent agency: Bureau of Industry and Security, United States Department of Commerce
- Website: www.bis.doc.gov/index.php/oee

The Office of Export Enforcement (OEE) is an agency within the United States Department of Commerce, Bureau of Industry and Security (BIS).

== Duties ==
The BIS is the principal agency involved in the development, implementation, and enforcement of export controls for commercial technologies and for many military technologies as a result of the President's Export Control Reform Initiative.

The OEE focuses only on export enforcement and works closely with intelligence analysts and licensing officers within a single bureau of the government to enforce export control laws and regulations.

=== Investigation scope ===
The OEE investigates violations of the Export Control Reform Act, the International Emergency Economic Powers Act, the Export Administration Regulations, the Fastener Quality Act, and other export control and public safety statutes. It also investigates the unauthorized re-export or transfer of items subject to the EAR to prohibited end-uses, end-users, or destinations, by US and foreign persons regardless of location. The Office works closely with other federal law enforcement agencies, such as the U.S. Immigration and Customs Enforcement's Homeland Security Investigations (HSI), to identify and act on export violations and with industry to raise awareness of compliance best practices and “red flag” indicators of potential illicit activities.

Its Special Agents initiate investigations based on information obtained in a variety of ways: such as routine reviews of export documentation to overseas end-use verifications or using industry and supply chain sources.

== Locations ==
OEE maintains field offices across the United States, including its headquarters in Washington, DC, eight field offices located in Boston, Chicago, Dallas, Los Angeles, Miami, New York, Northern Virginia and San Jose, and resident offices in Atlanta, Houston, and Portland.

Also, OEE Special Agents have been deployed to Federal Bureau of Investigation field offices in Atlanta, Charlotte, Cincinnati, Minneapolis, Phoenix, San Diego, and Salt Lake City, as well as to Defense Criminal Investigative Service offices in Denver and San Antonio, to provide enhanced coverage for investigating export violations.

== Special agents ==
OEE Special Agents apprehend violators, and work with U.S. Attorneys, BIS's Office of Chief Counsel and other officials in criminal prosecutions and administrative cases based on OEE investigations.

OEE Special Agents are sworn federal law enforcement officers with authority to bear firearms, make arrests, execute search warrants, serve subpoenas, detain and seize items about to be illegally exported, and order the redelivery to the United States of goods exported in violation of U.S. law.

== Significant cases investigated by OEE ==
=== Mayrow General Trading Network ===
Mayrow General Trading was a distributor and reseller of electronic components located in Dubai, UAE. The company utilized a network of organizations and individuals who routinely redirected US origin goods and technology to end-users located in Iran.

In 2005, components sold to Mayrow from a US exporter were found in an unexploded roadside bomb in Iraq. At the time, the exporting company was not required to apply for a license, as the goods were below export control thresholds.

BIS responded by issuing General Order No. 3 in Part 736 of the Export Administration Regulations, which imposed a license requirement for goods and technology exported or re-exported to the individuals and companies which comprised the Mayrow General Trading Network. Later, this order was superseded by adding the parties to the BIS Entity List.

These administrative actions allowed OEE investigators to interdict goods intended for diversion to Iran, identify 75 subjects involved in the procurement of these goods, and help industry to identify and stop illicit transactions intended for diversion by the network.

=== Xun Wang, PPG Paints Trading Shanghi and Huaxing Construction ===
From 2006 through 2007, Chinese companies PPG Paints Trading Shanghai Co Ltd, Huaxing Construction Co Ltd., and Xun Wang, managing director of PPG Paints Trading, conspired to provide high-performance epoxy coatings from the US for use in the construction of the Chashma II Nuclear Power Plant in Pakistan.

Chashma II is owned by the Pakistan Atomic Energy Commission, which appears on the BIS Entity List. The epoxy coatings were transshipped via a third party in the People's Republic of China without the required export license.

In December 2012, Huaxing Construction pleaded guilty and as part of its plea agreement, agreed to pay the maximum criminal fine of $2 million, with $1 million suspended if no further violations occur during the five years of probation.

Under the terms of a related civil settlement, Huaxing Construction also agreed to pay another $1 million, implement an export compliance program, a five-year Denial Order suspended if no further violations occurring during that period, and be subject to multiple third-party audits over the following five years.

Xun Wang also pleaded guilty and was sentenced to 12 months in prison, a $100,000 criminal fine, and one year of probation.

Under the terms of a related civil settlement, Wang also agreed to pay a civil penalty of $250,000 (with $50,000 suspended), and to be placed on the Denied Persons List for a period of ten years with five years suspended.

In December 2010, PPG Paints Trading Shanghai pleaded guilty, and as part of its plea agreement agreed to pay the maximum criminal fine of $2 million, serve five years of corporate probation, and forfeit $32,319 to the US government.

Under the terms of a related civil settlement, PPG Paints Trading Shanghai also agreed to pay a civil penalty of $1 million and complete third-party audits. Huaxing Construction's guilty plea in this case marks the first time a Chinese corporate entity has entered a plea of guilty in a US criminal export matter.

=== Corezing International PTE Ltd ===
Corezing International was a sole proprietor general wholesaler doing business in Singapore and Hong Kong.

Corezing conspired with Hossein Larijani to illegally export 6,000 radio frequency modules through Singapore to Iran, which were later found in the remoted detonators of improvised explosive devices in Iraq.

Corezing employees provided false documents showing the items would be used in a telecommunications project in Singapore when, in reality, the devices were shipped to Iran.

In October, 2011 four people who worked for Corezing: Wong Yuh Lan, Lim Yong Nam, Lim Kow Seng, and Hia Soo Gan Benson were arrested by Singapore authorities in connection with a US extradition request.

A $3,000,000 reward has been offered for information leading to the arrest of Larijani, who remains at large as of January 2019.

=== ZTE Corporation ===
Over a period of almost six years, China's ZTE Corporation obtained US-origin items, including controlled dual-use goods, incorporated the items into ZTE equipment and shipped the equipment to customers in Iran.

ZTE engaged in this conduct knowing that such shipments to Iran were illegal. ZTE further lied to federal investigators during the course of the investigation when it insisted, through outside and in-house counsel, that the company had stopped sending U.S.-origin items to Iran.

While the investigation was ongoing, ZTE resumed its business with Iran and shipped millions of dollars’ worth of US items there. ZTE also created an elaborate scheme to hide the data related to these transactions from a forensic accounting firm hired by defense counsel to conduct a review of ZTE's transactions with sanctioned countries.

It did so knowing that the information provided to the forensic accounting firm would be reported to the US government by outside counsel. Outside counsel was not aware of this scheme and indeed was wholly unaware that ZTE had resumed business with Iran. After ZTE informed its counsel of the scheme, counsel reported – with permission from ZTE – the conduct to the US government.

Uncovered in the investigation were two ZTE corporate documents entitled “Report Regarding Comprehensive Reorganization and the Standardization of the Company Export Control Related Matters” and “Proposal for Import and Export Control Risk Avoidance.”

These documents outline a ZTE-developed scheme to violate U.S. export control laws by establishing, controlling, and using a series of “detached” (e.g., shell or front) companies to illicitly reexport controlled items to sanctioned countries without authorization.

ZTE agreed to enter a guilty plea and to pay a $430,488,798 penalty to the U.S., and simultaneously reached settlement agreements with BIS and the US Department of the Treasury's Office of Foreign Assets Control.

In total ZTE agreed to pay the US Government $892,360,064. BIS originally suspended an additional $300,000,000, which would be reinstated if ZTE were to violate its settlement agreement.

On April 15, 2018, BIS activated the suspended denial order against ZTE in response to ZTE falsely informing the US Government that it would or had disciplined numerous employees responsible for the violations, when in fact ZTE had rewarded that illegal activity with bonuses.

Under this agreement, ZTE paid $1 billion and placed an additional $400 million in suspended penalty money in escrow before BIS removed ZTE from the Denied Persons List.

These penalties are in addition to the $892 million in penalties under the March 2017 settlement agreement.

== See also ==
- Export Administration Regulations
- International Traffic in Arms Regulations
- United States sanctions
