= Zangger Committee =

International nuclear export control group

The Zangger Committee, also known as the Nuclear Exporters Committee, sprang from Article III.2 of the Treaty on the Non-Proliferation of Nuclear Weapons (NPT) which entered into force on March 5, 1970. Under the terms of Article III.2 International Atomic Energy Agency (IAEA) safeguards must be applied to nuclear exports.

Each State Party to the Treaty undertakes not to provide: (a) source or special fissionable material, or (b) equipment or material especially designed or prepared for the processing, use or production of special fissionable material, to any non-nuclear-weapon State for peaceful purposes, unless the source or special fissionable material shall be subject to the safeguards required by this Article.

== History ==
Between 1971 and 1974, a group of 15 nuclear supplier states held a series of informal meetings in Vienna chaired by Professor Claude Zangger of Switzerland. The group's objective was to reach a common understanding on: (a) the definition of "equipment or material especially designed or prepared for the processing, use or production of special fissionable material;" and (b) the conditions and procedures that would govern exports of such equipment or material in order to meet the obligations of Article III.2 on the basis of fair commercial competition. The group, which became known as the Zangger Committee, decided that it would be informal and that its decisions would not be legally binding upon its members.

The committee (a) maintains and updates a list of equipment that may only be exported if safeguards are applied to the recipient facility (called the "Trigger List" because such exports trigger the requirement for safeguards); and (b) allows members to coordinate on nuclear export issues. The relative informality of the Zangger Committee has enabled it to take the lead on certain nonproliferation issues that would be more difficult to resolve in the Nuclear Suppliers Group. Moreover, the People's Republic of China is a member of the Zangger Committee.

At the October 2000 meeting, the committee discussed the results of the 2000 NPT Review Conference (REVCON). The committee agreed to form two informal "Friends of the Chair" groups to: 1) consider preparations for the 2005 NPT REVCON; and 2) continue consideration of possible future adoption of a policy of requiring full-scope safeguards as a condition of supply to non-nuclear weapon states. The U.S. reported on the status of consideration of possible additional controls on americium and neptunium. Members agreed that these materials fell outside the scope of NPT Article III.2 for inclusion on the Trigger List. Sweden, chair of a working group to consider addition of plutonium enrichment equipment to the Trigger List, reported no agreement as yet. The chairman reported on an initial informal meeting with IAEA staff to discuss procedures for keeping the agency informed on Trigger List changes and the rationale for such changes, since the agency uses the Zangger Trigger List as a reference document.

== Chairs ==
The following have served as chairs of the Zangger Committee:

- 1971–1989: Dr. Claude Zangger (Switzerland)
- 1989–1993: Ilkka Mäkipentti (Finland)
- 1993–2005: Fritz Schmidt (Austria)
- 2006–2010: Pavel Klucký (Czech Republic)
- 2010–2015: Shawn Caza (Canada)
- 2015–present: Louise Fluger Callesen (Denmark)

The United Kingdom Mission to the United Nations Office at Vienna acts as the committee's secretariat.

== Members ==
There are 39 Members States in the Zangger Committee:

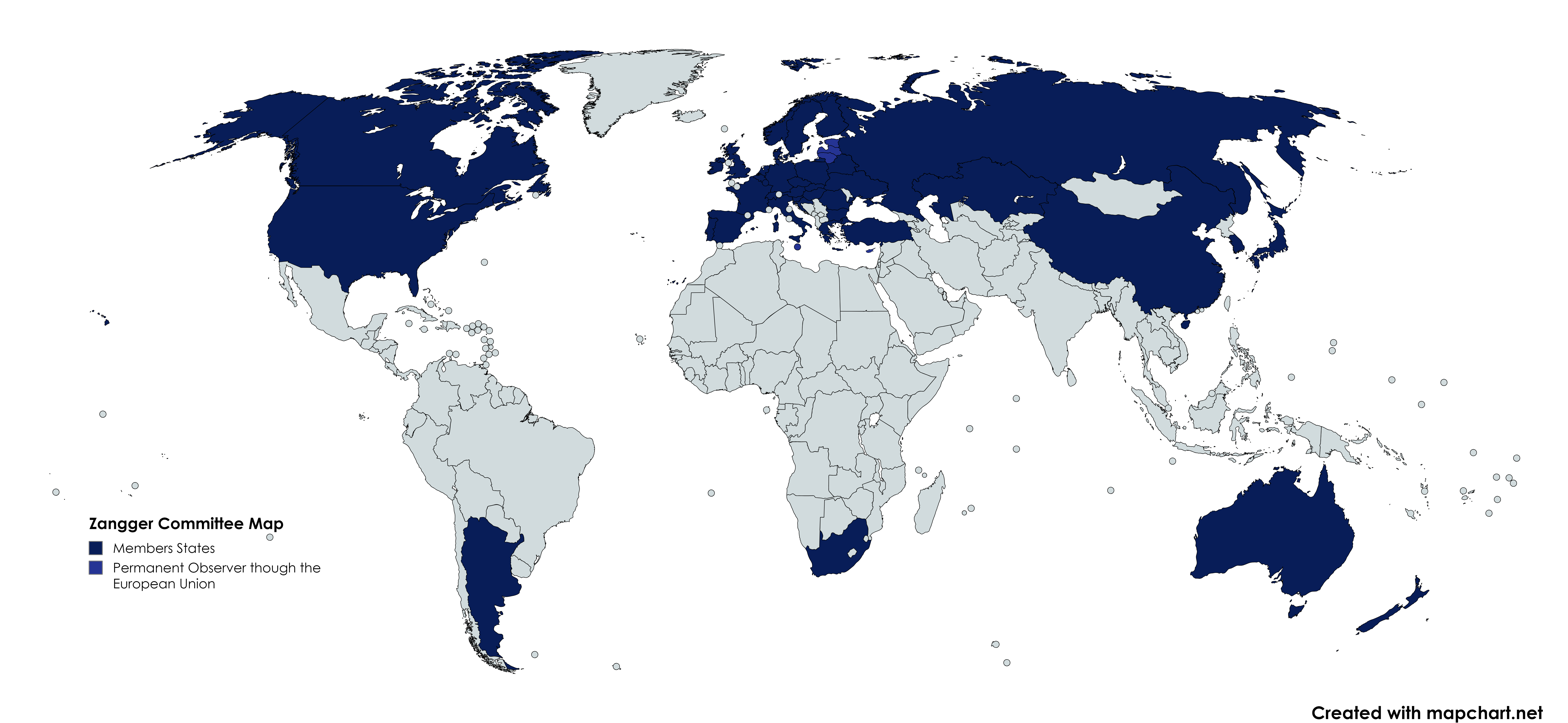
Zangger Committee map

- Argentina
- Australia
- Austria
- Belarus
- Belgium
- Bulgaria
- Canada
- China
- Croatia
- Czech Republic
- Denmark
- Finland
- France
- Germany
- Greece
- Hungary
- (Republic of Ireland) Ireland
- Italy
- Japan
- Kazakhstan
- South Korea
- Luxembourg
- Netherlands
- New Zealand
- Norway
- Poland
- Portugal
- Romania
- Russia
- Slovakia
- Slovenia
- South Africa
- Spain
- Sweden
- Switzerland
- Turkey
- Ukraine
- United Kingdom
- United States

The (European Union) European Commission is a permanent observer.
