= Missile Technology Control Regime =

1987 arms control understanding among 35 nations including the G7

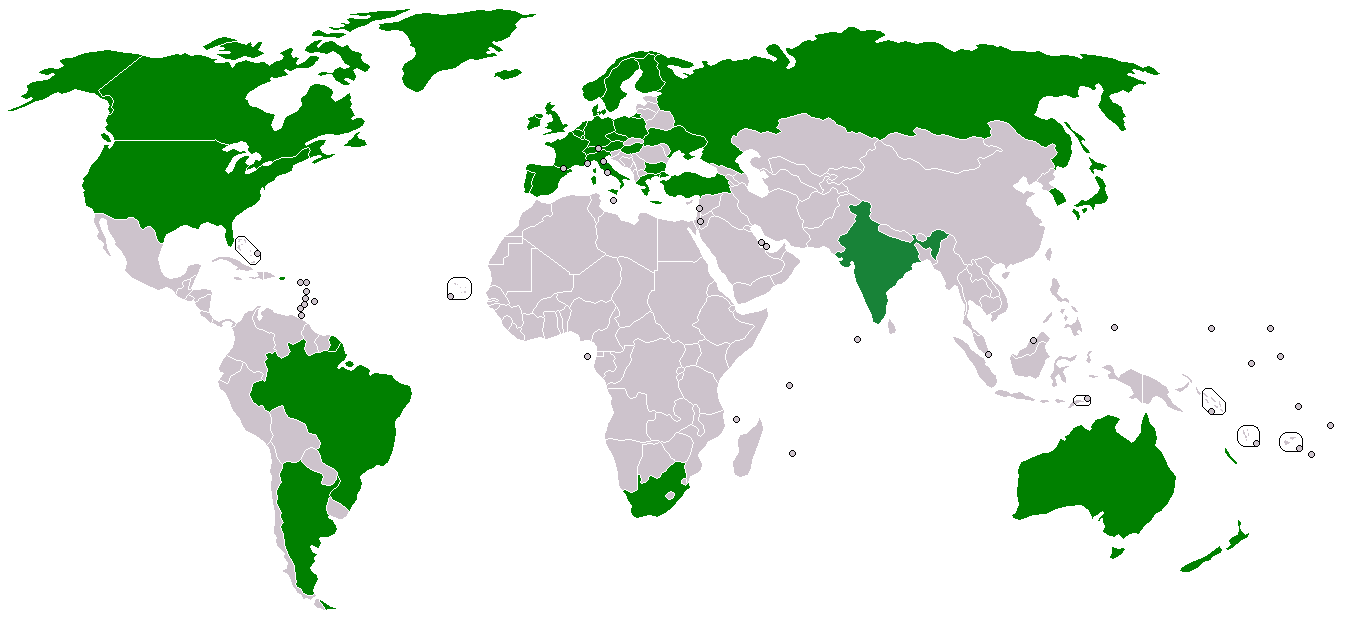
MTCR members

The Missile Technology Control Regime (MTCR) is a multilateral export control regime. It is an informal political understanding among 35 member states that seek to limit the proliferation of missiles and missile technology. The regime was formed in 1987 by the G-7 industrialized countries. The MTCR seeks to limit the risks of proliferation of weapons of mass destruction (WMD) by controlling exports of goods and technologies that could make a contribution to delivery systems (other than manned aircraft) for such weapons. In this context, the MTCR places particular focus on rockets and unmanned aerial vehicles capable of delivering a payload of at least 500 kilograms (1,100 lb) to a range of at least 300 kilometres (190 mi) and on equipment, software, and technology for such systems.

The MTCR is not a treaty and does not impose any legally binding obligations on partners (members). Rather, it is an informal political understanding among states that seek to limit the proliferation of missiles and missile technology.

== Guidelines and the Equipment, Software and Technology Annex ==
The Regime’s documents include the MTCR Guidelines and the Equipment, Software and Technology Annex. The Guidelines define the purpose of the MTCR and provide the overall structure and rules to guide the member countries and those adhering unilaterally to the Guidelines. The Equipment, Software and Technology Annex is designed to assist in implementing export controls on MTCR Annex items. The Annex is divided into “Category I” and “Category II” items. It includes a broad range of equipment and technology, both military and dual-use, that are relevant to missile development, production, and operation. Partner countries exercise restraint in the consideration of all transfers of items contained in the Annex. All such transfers are considered on a case by case basis.

Greatest restraint is applied to what are known as Category I items. These items include complete rocket systems (including ballistic missiles, space launch vehicles and sounding rockets) and unmanned air vehicle systems (including cruise missiles systems, target and reconnaissance drones) with capabilities exceeding a 300km/500kg range/payload threshold; production facilities for such systems; and major sub-systems including rocket stages, re-entry vehicles, rocket engines, guidance systems and warhead mechanisms.

The remainder of the annex is regarded as Category II, which includes complete rocket systems (including ballistic missiles systems, space launch vehicles and sounding rockets) and unmanned air vehicles (including cruise missile systems, target drones, and reconnaissance drones) not covered in item I, capable of a maximum range equal to or greater than, 300km. Also included are a wide range of equipment, material, and technologies, most of which have uses other than for missiles capable of delivering WMD. While still agreeing to exercise restraint, partners have greater flexibility in the treatment of Category II transfer applications.

The MTCR Guidelines specifically state that the Regime is “not designed to impede national space programs or international cooperation in such programs as long as such programs could not contribute to delivery systems for weapons of mass destruction.” MTCR partners are careful with satellite launch vehicle equipment and technology transfers, however, since the technology used in an SLV is virtually identical to that used in a ballistic missile, which poses genuine potential for missile proliferation.

== History ==
The Missile Technology Control Regime (MTCR) was established in April 1987 by the G7 countries: Canada, France, Germany, Italy, Japan, the United Kingdom, and the United States. It was created to curb the spread of unmanned delivery systems for nuclear weapons, specifically systems which can carry a payload of 500 kilograms (1,100 lb) for 300 kilometres (190 mi).

The MTCR applies to exports to members and non-members. An aide-mémoire attached to the agreement says that it does not supersede prior agreements, which NATO members say allows the supply of Category 1 systems between NATO members. An example is the export by the United States of Trident missiles to the United Kingdom for nuclear-weapons delivery.

At the annual meeting in Oslo from 29 June to 2 July 1992, chaired by Sten Lundbo, it was agreed to expand the MTCR's scope to include nonproliferation of unmanned aerial vehicles (UAVs) for weapons of mass destruction. Prohibited materials are divided into two categories, which are outlined in the MTCR Equipment, Software, and Technology Annex. Thirty-five nations are members, with India joining on 27 June 2016.

According to the Arms Control Association, the MTCR has been successful in helping to slow (or stop) several ballistic missile programs: "Argentina, Egypt, and Iraq abandoned their joint Condor II ballistic missile program. Brazil and South Africa also shelved or eliminated missile or space launch vehicle programs. Some former Warsaw Pact countries, such as Poland and the Czech Republic, destroyed their ballistic missiles, in part, to better their chances of joining MTCR." In October 1994, the MTCR member states established a "no undercut" policy: if one member denies the sale of technology to another country, all members must do likewise.

China originally viewed the MTCR as a discriminatory measure by Western governments, which sold sophisticated military aircraft while restricting sales of competing ballistic missiles. It verbally agreed that it would adhere to the MTCR in November 1991, and included the assurance in a letter from its foreign minister in February 1992. China reiterated its pledge in the October 1994 US-China joint statement. In their October 1997 joint statement, the United States and China said that they agreed "to build on the 1994 Joint Statement on Missile Nonproliferation." The Missiles and Missile-related Items and Technologies Export Control List, a formal regulation, was issued in August 2002. The following year, the MTCR chair invited China to participate. China requested to join the MTCR in 2004, but membership was not offered because of concerns about the country's export-control standards. Israel, Romania and Slovakia have agreed to follow MTCR export rules, although they are not yet members.

The regime has its limitations; member countries have been known to clandestinely violate the rules. Some of these countries, with varying degrees of foreign assistance, have deployed medium-range ballistic missiles which can travel more than 1,000 kilometres (620 mi) and are researching missiles with greater ranges; Israel and China have deployed strategic nuclear SLCMs, ICBMs and satellite-launch systems. Countries which are not MTCR members buy and sell on the global arms market; North Korea is currently viewed as the primary source of ballistic-missile proliferation in the world, and China has supplied ballistic missiles and technology to Pakistan. China supplied DF-3A IRBMs to Saudi Arabia in 1988 before it informally agreed to follow MTCR guidelines. Israel cannot export its Shavit space-launch system due to its non-member MTCR status, although the Clinton administration allowed an import waiver for US companies to buy the Shavit in 1994.

Over 20 countries have ballistic missile systems. The International Code of Conduct against Ballistic Missile Proliferation (ICOC), also known as the Hague Code of Conduct, was established in 2002. The code, which calls for restraint and care in the proliferation of ballistic missile systems capable of delivering weapons of mass destruction, has 119 members. Its mission is similar to the MTCR's, an export group.

India applied for membership in June 2015 with support from Russia, France and the United States, and became a member on 27 June 2016.

Pakistan is not a member of the MTCR. Although it has expressed a desire to join the group, it has not submitted an application. The Pakistani government has pledged to adhere to MTCR guidelines, and analysts believe that the country is doing so. However, they haven't provided any evidence in support of the same.

In 2020, the U.S. government announced that it would reinterpret its implementation of the MTCR to expedite sales of unmanned aerial vehicles (UAVs) to other countries. The revised U.S. policy will reinterpret how the MTCR applies to drones which travel at speeds under 800 kilometres per hour (500 mph), such as the Predator and Reaper drones (made by General Atomics) and the Global Hawk drone (made by Northrop Grumman).

== Members ==
The MTCR has 35 members.

- Argentina, 1993
- Australia, 1990
- Austria, 1991
- Belgium, 1990
- Bulgaria, 2004
- Brazil, 1995
- Canada, 1987
- Czech Republic, 1998
- Denmark, 1990
- Finland, 1991
- France, 1987
- Germany, 1987
- Greece, 1992
- Hungary, 1993
- Iceland, 1993
- India, 2016
- (Republic of Ireland) Ireland, 1992
- Italy, 1987
- Japan, 1987
- Luxembourg, 1990
- Netherlands, 1990
- New Zealand, 1991
- Norway, 1990
- Poland, 1997
- Portugal, 1992
- (South Korea) Republic of Korea, 2001
- (Russia) Russian Federation, 1995
- South Africa, 1995
- Spain, 1990
- Sweden, 1991
- Switzerland, 1992
- Turkey, 1997
- Ukraine, 1998
- United Kingdom, 1987
- United States, 1987

Non-members pledging to adhere to MTCR include:

- China, 2002
- Israel
- Pakistan
- Romania
- Slovakia
