= William Alan Reinsch =

Former U.S. Government Official

Bill Reinsch
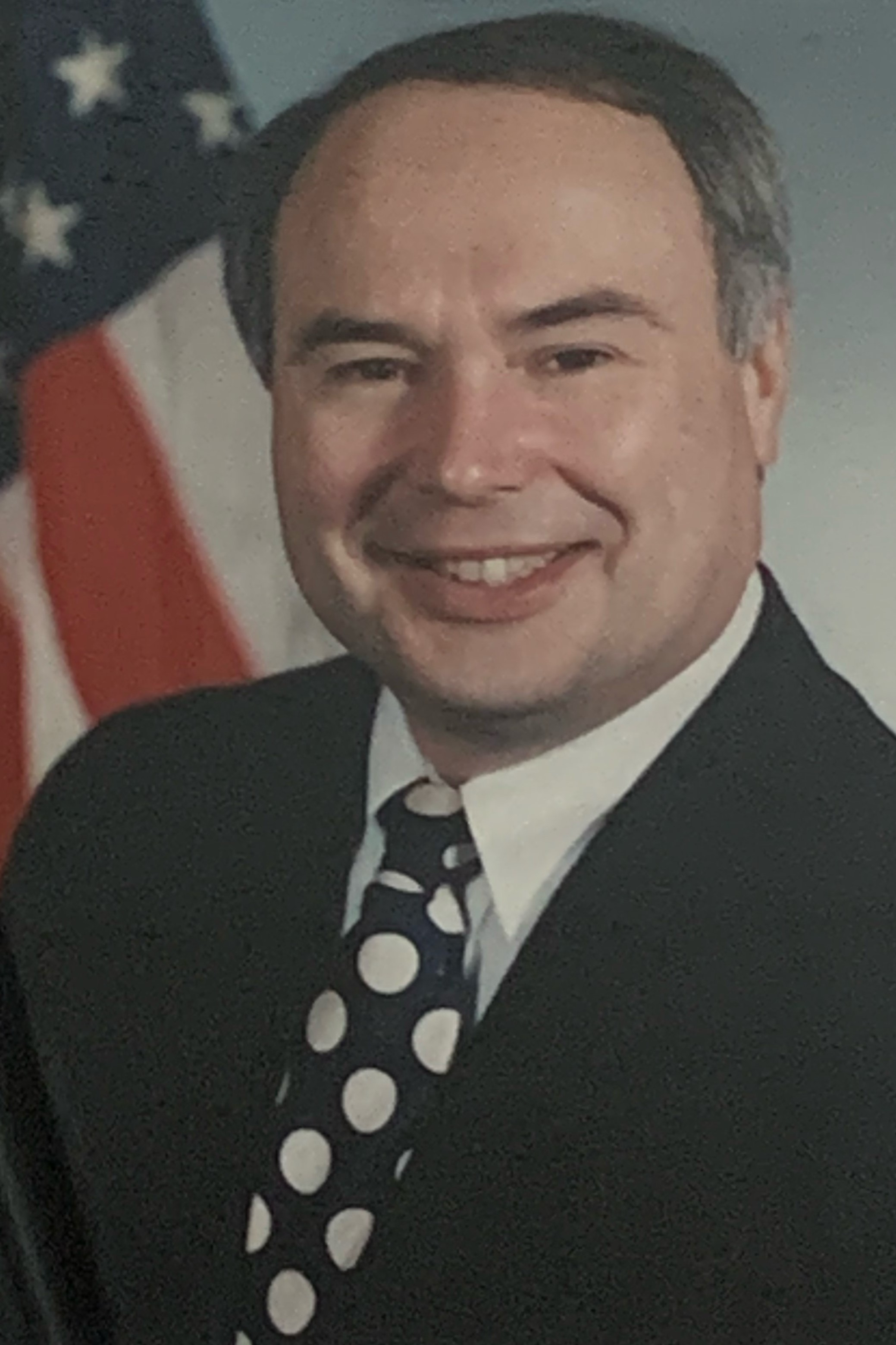

3rd Under Secretary of Commerce for Industry and Security
- In office May 1994 – March 2001
- President: Bill Clinton
- Preceded by: Dennis E. Kloske
- Succeeded by: Kenneth I. Juster

Personal details
- Born: January 15, 1946 (age 80) United States
- Party: Democratic
- Spouse: Susan Polley Reinsch
- Children: 2
- Education: Johns Hopkins University (BA)(MA)

William Alan Reinsch (born 1946) is a U.S. trade policy expert and former government official who served as Under Secretary of Commerce for Export Administration during the Clinton administration from 1994 to 2001. He served as president of the National Foreign Trade Council from 2001 to 2016 and concurrently as a member of the U.S.-China Economic and Security Review Commission. Bill is now a Senior Adviser and Scholl Chair Emeritus with the Economics Program and Scholl Chair in International Business at the Center for Strategic and International Studies (CSIS), where he co-hosts The Trade Guys podcast. He also was previously an adjunct assistant professor at the University of Maryland School of Public Policy, teaching a course on international trade policy.

== Early life and education ==
Reinsch received a Bachelor of Arts in International Relations in 1968 from Johns Hopkins University and a Master of Arts from the Johns Hopkins School of Advanced International Studies in 1969.

== Early career ==
Reinsch began his career as a school teacher in Bethesda, Maryland, before transitioning to public service. Between 1973 and 1976, he served as a legislative assistant to Representatives Richard Ottinger and Gilbert Gude. He also served as Acting Staff Director of the House Environmental Study Conference.

In 1977, Reinsch joined the office of Senator John Heinz as Chief Legislative Assistant, focusing on foreign trade and competitiveness policy. He worked for Heinz for 14 years, providing support to the Senator in his roles as chairman and ranking member of the Senate Banking Subcommittee on International Finance and as a member of the Senate Finance Subcommittee on International Trade, Customs, and Global Competitiveness. Reinsch's work included contributions to five revisions of the Export Administration Act and four major trade bills.

From 1991 to 1993, Reinsch served as Senior Legislative Assistant to Senator Jay Rockefeller, overseeing trade, international economic policy, foreign affairs, and defense issues. He provided staff support for Rockefeller's work on the Finance Committee and the Commerce, Science, and Transportation Committee.

== Under Secretary of Commerce ==
In January 1994, President Bill Clinton nominated Reinsch to serve as Under Secretary of Commerce for Export Administration, now known as the Under Secretary of Commerce for Industry and Security. The Senate confirmed Reinsch by voice vote in May 1994. He led the Bureau of Export Administration, now known as the Bureau of Industry and Security, until March 2001, leaving office following the conclusion of the Clinton administration.

During his tenure at Commerce, Reinsch oversaw the development and enforcement of U.S. export control policies, including regulations on dual-use goods and technologies, and anti-boycott regulations. He directed particular efforts to updating controls amid economic globalization, specifically on high-performance computers, microprocessors, and encryption technologies. He also led the first major revisions to the Export Administration Regulations in over four decades, restructured the interagency review process for export license applications, and introduced an online system for electronic filing. During this time, Reinsch delivered more than two hundred speeches and testified fifty-three times before various committees of the Congress.

== After the Clinton administration ==
From 2001 to 2016, Reinsch served as president of the National Foreign Trade Council, an organization that represents U.S. companies on international tax and trade policy. In that role, he advocated for free trade policies, including the forging of new trade agreements such as the Trans-Pacific Partnership and active U.S participation at the World Trade Organization. He also characterized the U.S. sanction regime as "particularly pernicious for legal, foreign policy, and practical reasons," and opposed its unilateral approach, including via the Syria Accountability Act.

While at the NFTC, Reinsch simultaneously served as a commissioner on the U.S.-China Economic and Security Review Commission, which advises the U.S. Congress on the national security implications of the bilateral economic relationship between the United States and China. Reinsch was a Democratic appointee by then Senate Democratic Leader Harry Reid and in his 15-year tenure he held multiple leadership positions, including that of Chairman and Vice Chairman.

== CSIS and later work ==
In 2017, Reinsch joined the Center for Strategic and International Studies (CSIS) as a Senior Adviser and the Scholl Chair in International Business. At CSIS, he conducts research and provides commentary on international trade policy, export controls, and economic statecraft. As of April 2025, Reinsch has written over 500 articles, participated in 90 events, and contributed to 300 episodes of The Trade Guys, a weekly podcast that covers developments in U.S. trade policy.

Reinsch also served as a Senior Adviser at the law firm Kelley Drye & Warren between 2017 and 2025. In this role, he advised clients on international trade policy, export control regulations, and sanctions compliance.
