= Jeffrey Kessler =

Jeffrey Kessler may refer to:

- Jeffrey I. Kessler, American lawyer and Trump administration official
- Jeffrey L. Kessler (born 1954), American sports attorney
- Jeffrey V. Kessler (born 1955), American politician
