= Under Secretary of Commerce for Industry and Security =

Official in the U.S. Commerce Department

United States Under Secretary of Commerce for Industry and Security
- Seal of the Bureau of Industry and Security

- Flag of an under secretary of commerce

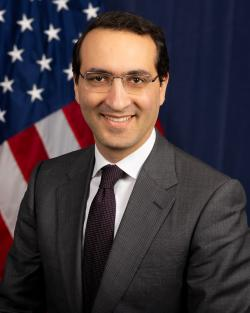
- Incumbent; Jeffrey I. Kessler since March 20, 2025
- Appointer: The president; with Senate advice and consent
- Formation: 1986
- Website: Official Website

The under secretary of commerce for industry and security, or USC(IS), is a high-ranking official in the United States Department of Commerce and the principal advisor to the United States secretary of commerce on the export of sensitive goods and technologies. The under secretary leads the Bureau of Industry and Security within the Commerce Department.

The under secretary is appointed by the president of the United States with consent of the United States Senate. On July 13, 2021, President Joe Biden announced that he would nominate former Department of Defense official Alan Estevez to the role and he was confirmed unanimously by the Senate on March 31, 2022.

== Overview ==
The under secretary of commerce for industry and security is the principal staff officer of the Commerce Department responsible for advancing United States national security and foreign policy. The under secretary oversees the Bureau of Industry and Security.

The under secretary promotes American national security objectives by ensuring an effective export control and treaty compliance system and promoting continued strategic technology leadership. This includes primary focus on export restrictions, export administration, anti-boycott enforcement, implementation of certain treaty requirements, defense priorities and allocations, strategic trade, and promotion of the defense-industrial base of the United States.

With the rank of under secretary, the USC(IS) is a Level III position within the Executive Schedule. Since Fiscal Year 2021, under the political appointee pay freeze, the functional annual rate of pay for Level III is $168,400.

== History ==
The position of under secretary, as well as the Bureau of Industry and Security, was created in 1985 to move the national security and export control functions away from the International Trade Administration which performs trade promotion among other activities.

=== Former under secretaries ===
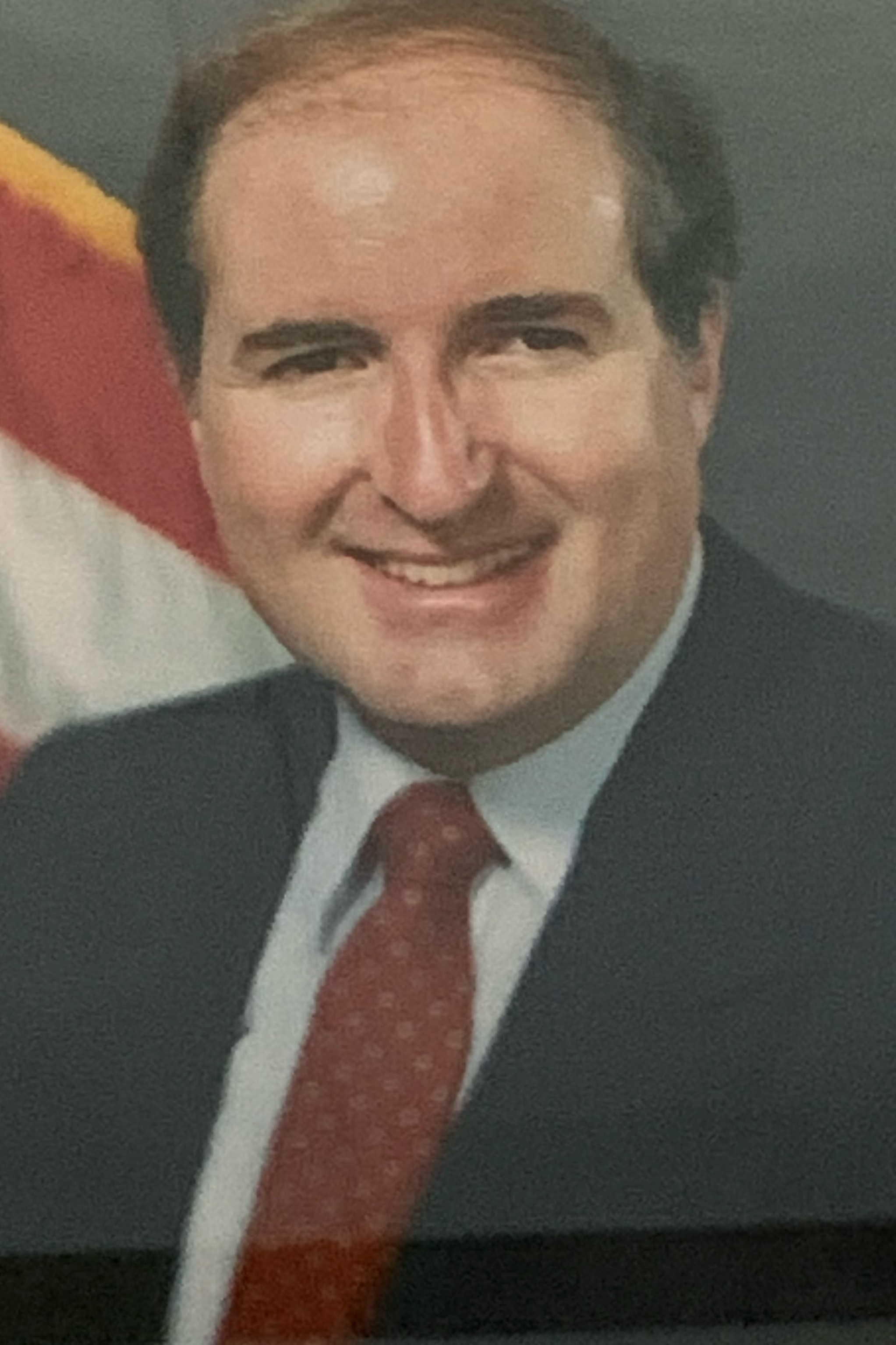
Paul Freedenberg, 1988-1989

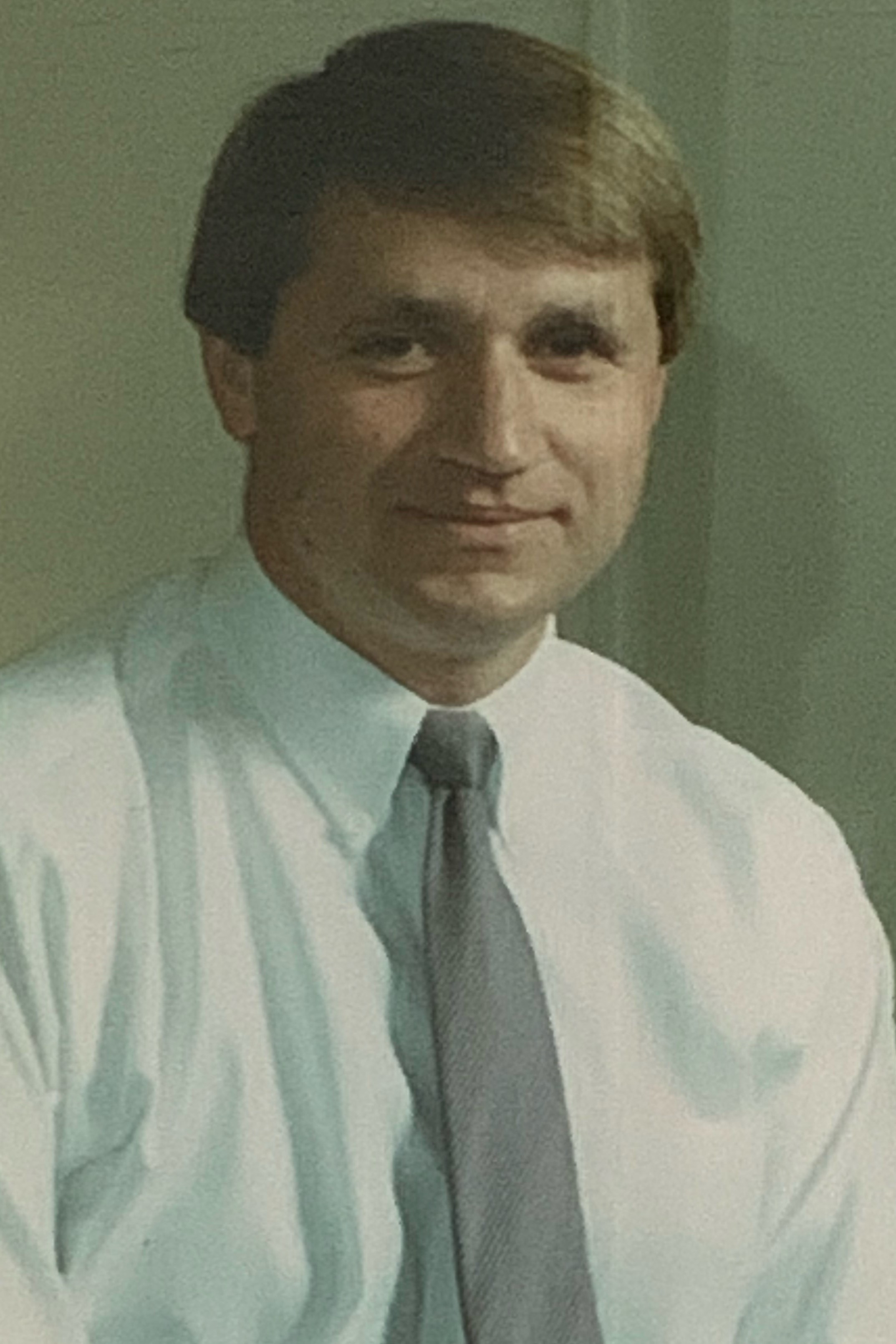
Dennis E. Kloske, 1989-1991

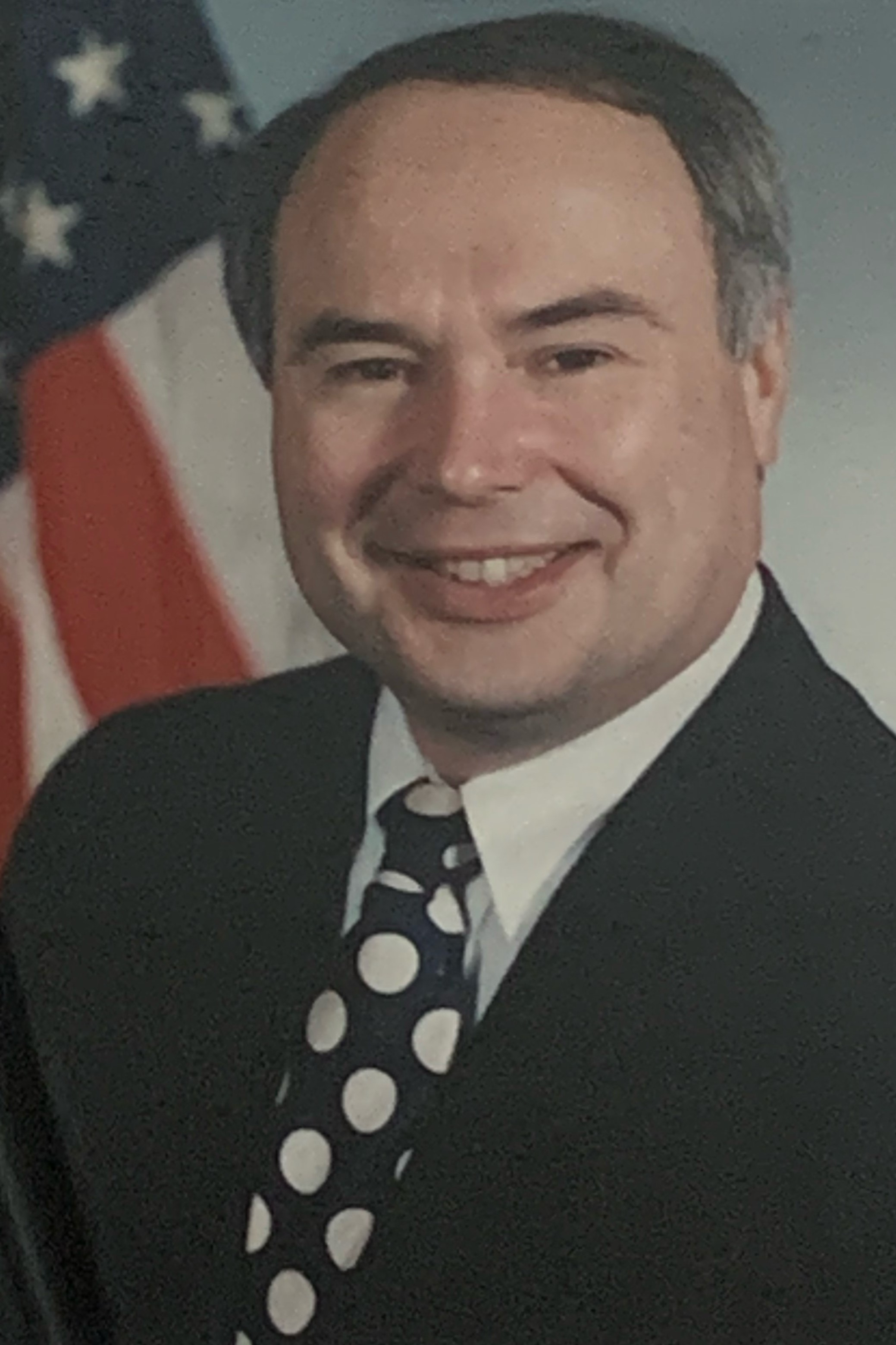
William Alan Reinsch, 1994-2001

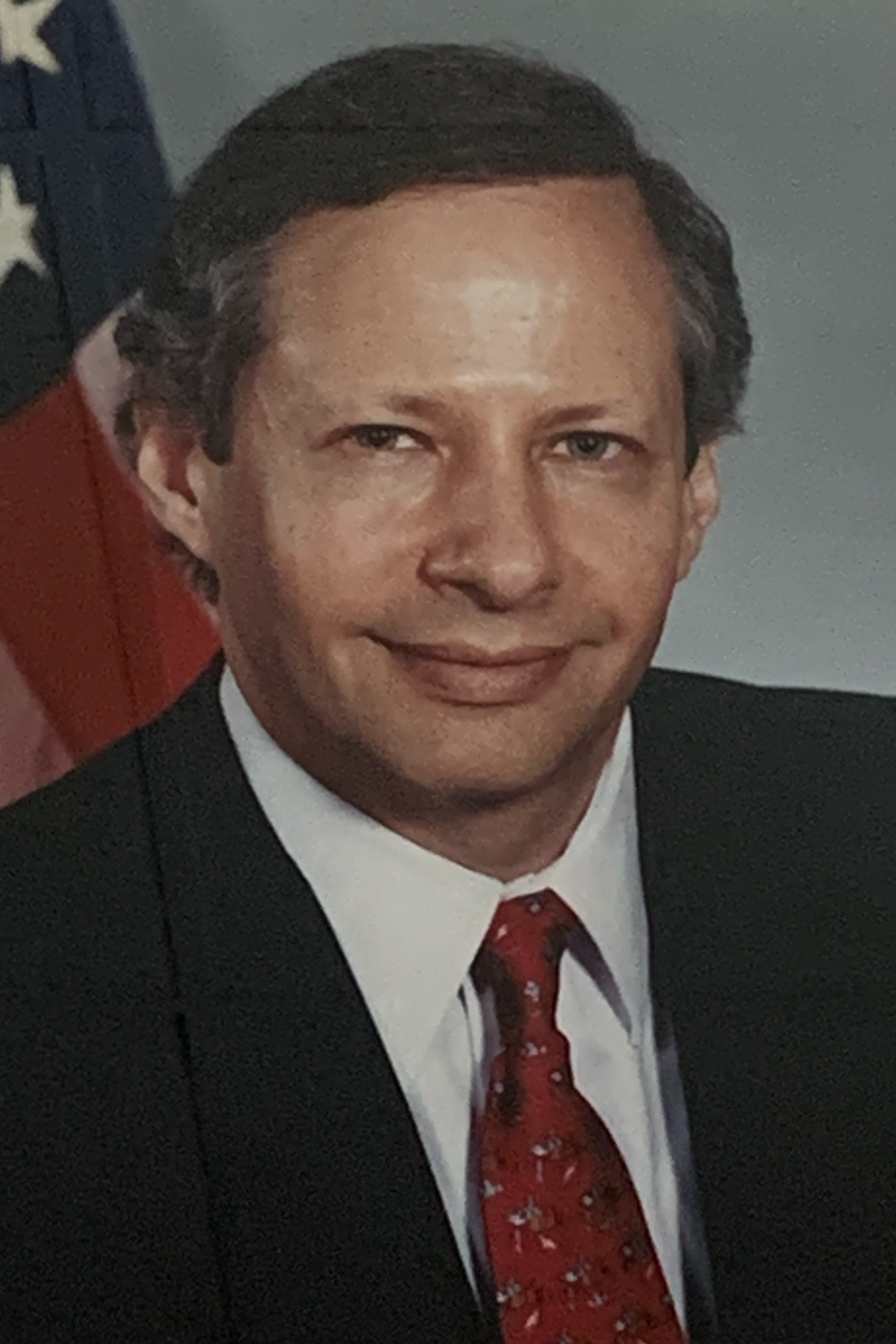
Kenneth I. Juster, 2001-2005

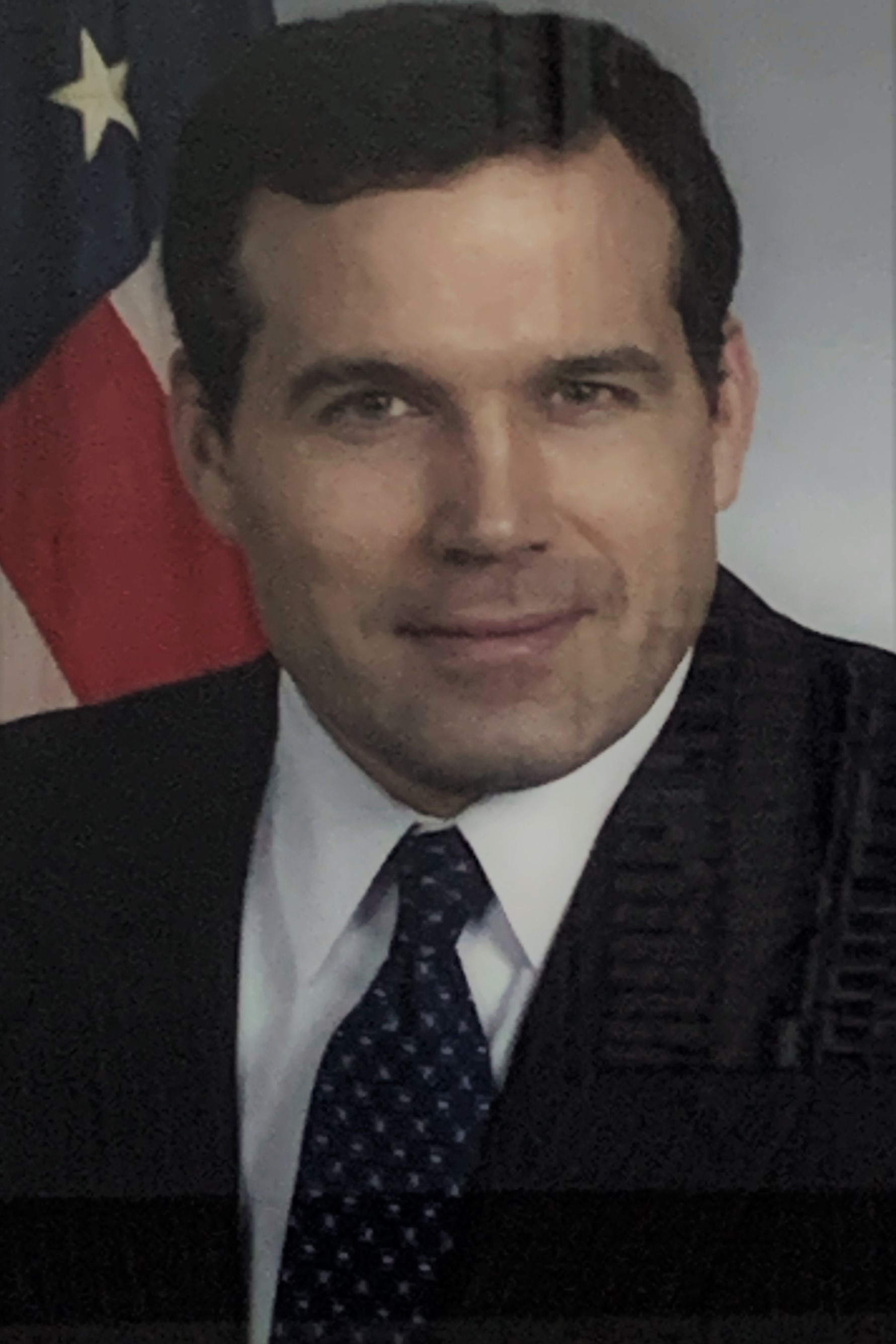
David H. McCormick, PhD, 2005-2006

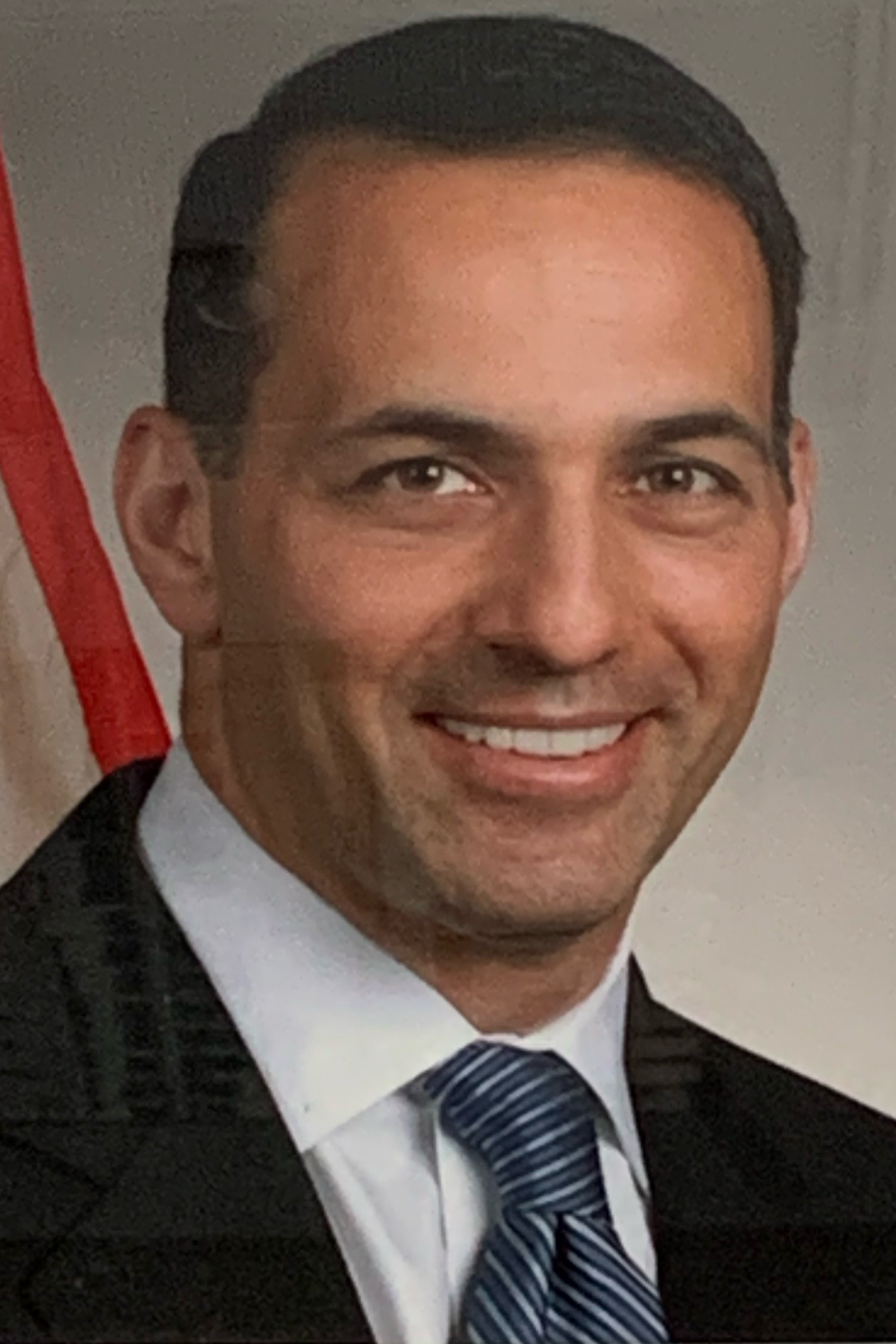
Mario Mancuso, 2007-2009

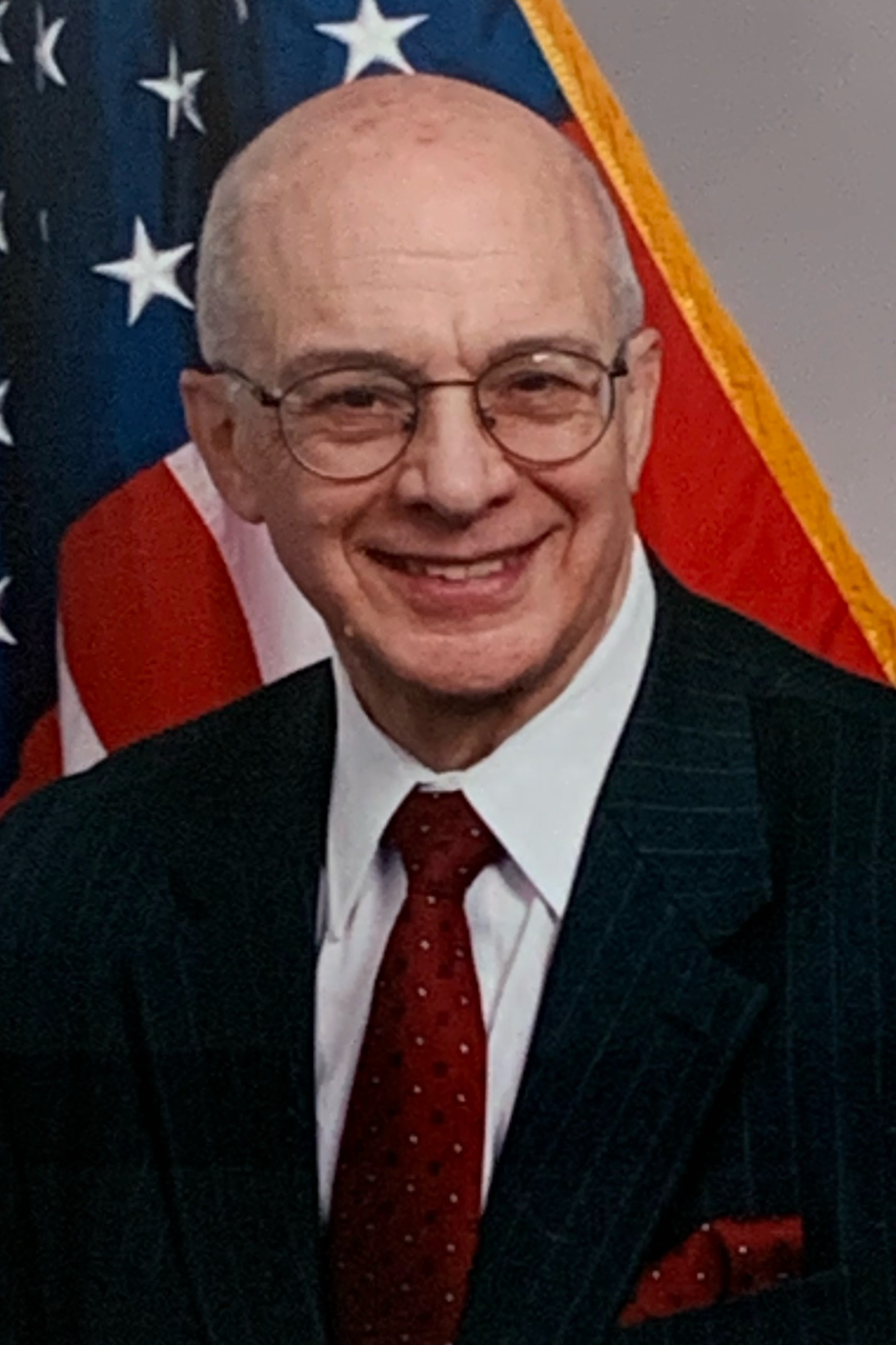
Eric L. Hirschhorn, 2010-2017

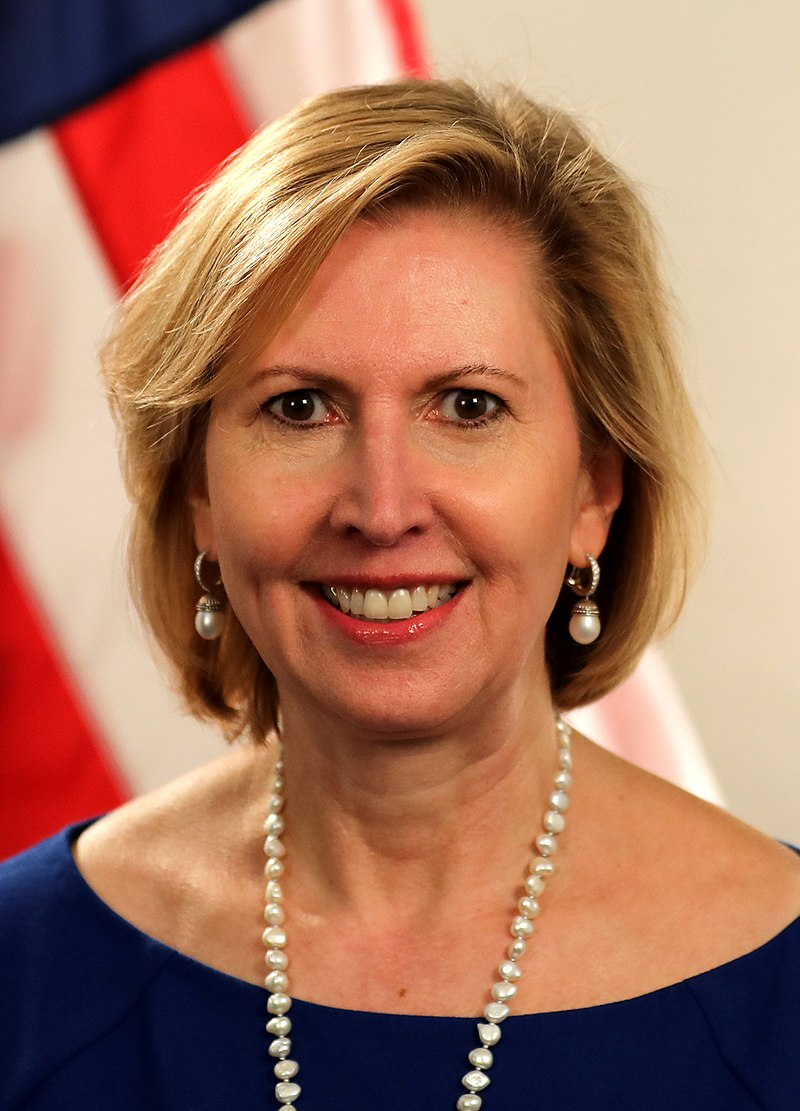
Mira R. Ricardel, 2017-2018

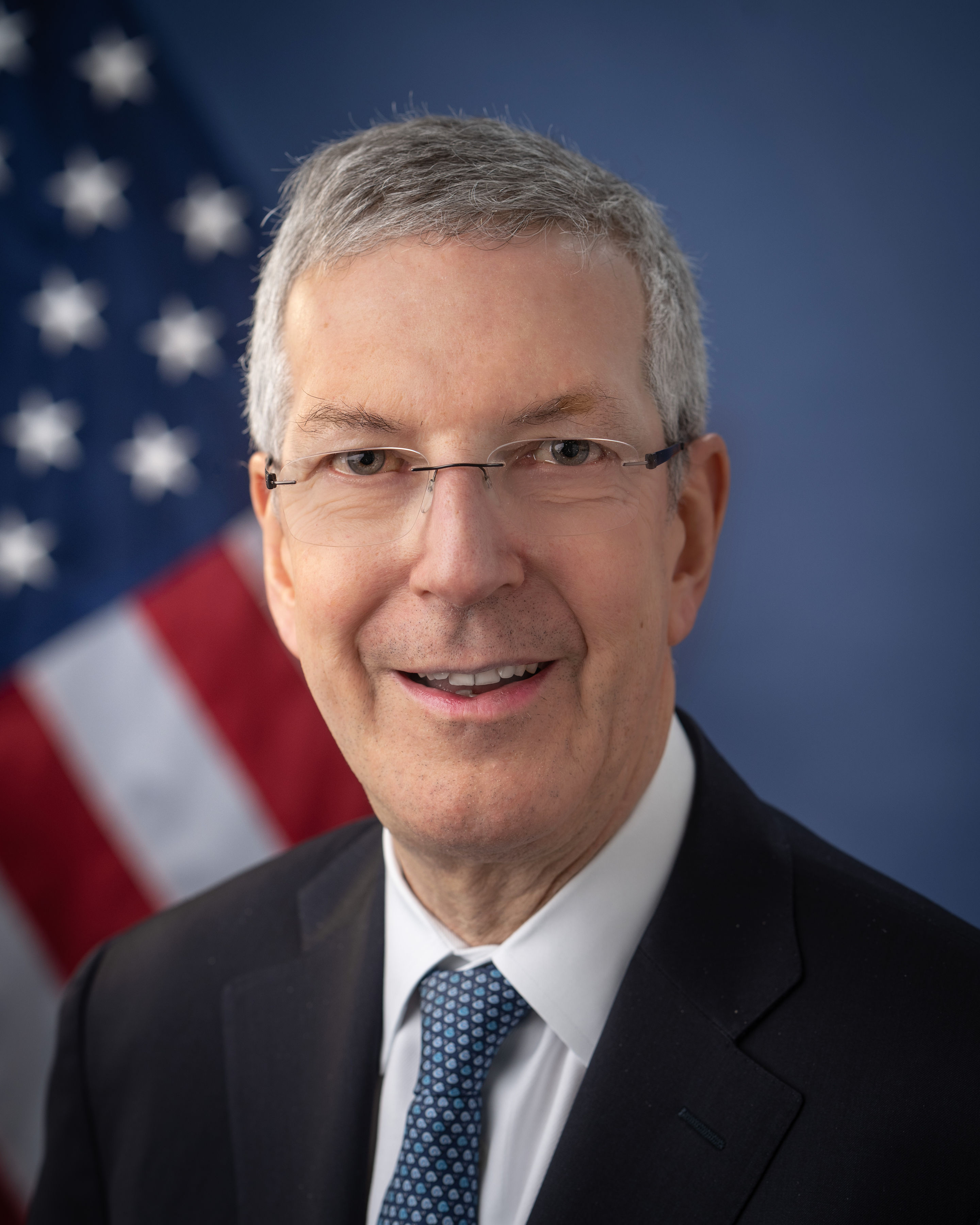
Alan Estevez, 2022-2025

== Reporting officials ==
Officials reporting to the USC(IS) include:

- Deputy Under Secretary of Commerce for Industry and Security
- Assistant Secretary of Commerce for Export Administration
  - Deputy Assistant Secretary of Commerce for Export Administration
- Assistant Secretary of Commerce for Export Enforcement
  - Deputy Assistant Secretary of Commerce for Export Enforcement
- Chief Financial Officer and Director of Administration
- Chief Information Officer
- Chief Counsel for Industry and Security (Office of the General Counsel)
