= Bureau of Industry and Security =

Bureau of the U.S. Department of Commerce

- Seal of the Bureau of Industry and Security

Agency overview
- Formed: 2002
- Jurisdiction: United States
- Headquarters: Washington, D.C., United States
- Employees: 587 (2024)
- Annual budget: US$222 million (2024)
- Agency executive: Jeffrey I. Kessler, Under Secretary of Commerce for Industry and Security
- Parent agency: U.S. Department of Commerce
- Website: www.bis.doc.gov

The Bureau of Industry and Security (BIS) is an agency of the United States Department of Commerce that deals with issues involving national security and high technology. A principal goal for the bureau is helping stop the proliferation of weapons of mass destruction, while furthering the growth of United States exports. The Bureau is led by the under secretary of commerce for industry and security.

BIS' mission is to advance U.S. national security, foreign policy, and economic interests. BIS activities include regulating the export of sensitive goods and dual-use technologies in an effective and efficient manner; enforcing export control, anti-boycott, and public safety laws; cooperating with and assisting other countries on export control and strategic trade issues; assisting U.S. industry to comply with international arms control agreements; monitoring the viability of the U.S. defense–industrial base; and promoting federal initiatives and public-private partnerships to protect the nation's critical infrastructures.

Items on the Commerce Control List (CCL) require a permit from the Department of Commerce before they can be exported. To determine whether an export permit is required, an Export Control Classification Number (ECCN) is used.

== History ==
Enforcement of export policy shifted between various units within the Department of Commerce and other federal agencies for decades. On October 1, 1987, the Bureau of Export Administration (BXA) was formally established within the Department of Commerce to consolidate export enforcement activities.

On April 18, 2002, the Department issued "Department Organization Order 10–16" to rename BXA to the Bureau of Industry and Security.

In the early 2020s, BIS drew increasing attention from policy advocates and think tanks as a potentially central instrument of American foreign policy and national security, particularly in shaping the global flow of critical technologies such as semiconductors and artificial intelligence amid intensifying great-power competition between the United States and China.

== Organization ==
The Bureau of Industry and Security, a component of the United States Department of Commerce, is organized by the United States Secretary of Commerce as follows:

- Under Secretary of Commerce for Industry and Security
  - Deputy Under Secretary of Commerce for Industry and Security
    - Office of the Chief Financial Officer and Director of Administration
    - Office of the Chief Information Officer
  - Assistant Secretary of Commerce for Export Administration
    - Office of National Security and Technology Transfer Controls
    - Office of Nonproliferation and Treaty Compliance
    - Office of Strategic Industries and Economic Security
    - Office of Exporter Services
    - Office of Technology Evaluation
  - Assistant Secretary of Commerce for Export Enforcement
    - Office of Export Enforcement
    - Office of Enforcement Analysis
    - Office of Antiboycott Compliance
  - Chief of Staff
    - Office of Congressional and Public Affairs
  - Office of the Chief Counsel for Industry and Security

== Guiding principles of the Bureau of Industry and Security ==
The main focus of the bureau is the security of the United States, which includes its national security, economic security, cyber security, and homeland security. For example, in the area of dual-use export controls, BIS administers and enforces such controls to stem the proliferation of weapons of mass destruction and the means of delivering them, to halt the spread of weapons to terrorists or countries of concern, and to further U.S. foreign policy objectives. Where there is credible evidence suggesting that the export of a dual-use item threatens U.S. security, the Bureau is empowered to prevent export of the item.

In addition to national security, BIS's function is to ensure the health of the U.S. economy and the competitiveness of U.S. industry. BIS promotes a strong defense–industrial base that can develop and provide technologies that will enable the United States to maintain its military superiority. BIS takes care to ensure that its regulations do not impose unreasonable restrictions on legitimate international commercial activity that are necessary for the health of U.S. industry.

== Lists of Parties of Concern ==
The Bureau maintains five major lists of parties with whom exportation is forbidden or requires licensing. The five lists are:

The Consolidated Screening List is a searchable database maintained under a collaboration of the Departments of Commerce, State and Treasury, to aid individuals and industries which may be engaged in overseas trade to determine whether transactions involving specific persons or items are legal, or whether licensure or special records are required.

The Entity List, which is regularly updated on both the BIS website and the Federal Register. Entities on the Entity List are subject to U.S. license requirements for the export or transfer of specified items, such as some U.S. technologies.

The Military End User List (MEU), published as a supplement to the Export Administration Regulations Section 744. The MEU identifies foreign parties as military end users that are subject to a license requirement for the export, reexport, or transfer (in-country) of certain, restricted items.

The Denied Persons List is a list of individuals and entities that have been denied export privileges involving items subject to the EAR.

The Unverified List is a list of parties whose bona fides BIS has been unable to verify. No license exceptions may be used for exports, reexports, or transfers (in-country) to unverified parties. A statement must be obtained from such parties prior to shipping items not subject to a license requirement.

== See also ==
- Title 15 of the Code of Federal Regulations
- Commodity Classification Automated Tracking System
- Committee on Foreign Investment in the United States
