= Export restriction =

Prohibition of exporting strategic technologies

Export restrictions, or a restriction on exportation, are limitations on the quantity of goods exported to a specific country or countries by a Government. Export restrictions could be aimed at achieving diverse policy objectives such as environmental protection, economic welfare, social wellbeing, conversion of natural resources, and controlling inflationary pressures. There are various forms of restrictions on export as defined by WTO's Trade Policy Reviews (TPR), for example, export duties, quantitative restrictions, voluntary export restrictions, export prohibitions and licensing requirements. Although some countries apply export restriction of various policy purposes, restrictions on exports provide price advantage for the domestic industries because these restrictions create price difference between domestic goods compared to the price of the same goods to foreign investors. Export restrictions don't always provide benefits for the country and more income for the government. In the field of agriculture and food sector export restrictions are aimed at protecting the domestic food security from international supply. During the food crises of 2007–2008, more than thirty countries imposed various export restriction measures such as quantitative export restrictions, prohibitions, export taxes, and price controls to protect the domestic food supply. However, this created additional pressures on the food crises by imposing high global prices and affecting the supply of food in the international market.

Within Environmental protection sector, export restrictions could cause market failure. For example, if a country puts export restriction on exporting minerals, natural resources, or wood stuff, it could cause market distortion that could also affect the distribution of welfare. Due to this, other countries might enter trade division and pause strict export restrictions on their domestic products which eventually constrains the objective of export restrictions that are supposed to provide positive objectives for the imposing country.

== The economic impact of export restrictions ==
Estimated number of bilateral cereal trade links affected by export-restrictive policies and correlation with bilateral import values across wheat, maize and rice.

The economic impact of the export restrictions depends on the size of the exporter. There are two types of exporters: small exporter (small country), and large exporter (large country). For a small exporter, export restrictions do not affect world market price but rather the domestic price. When there are restrictions on exported goods, the price of exported goods rise, therefore, export decreases and domestic good prices fall. This market failure is beneficial for consumers and is a disadvantage for producers. On the other hand, large exporter has the advantage of affecting the world price. When market prices rise due to export restrictions, the exporter gains from this high price of the goods it exports.

== Welfare impact of export restrictions ==
Restriction in export causes welfare loss in the national and international levels but the impact of these restrictions differs according to the elasticity of demand and supply of the exported goods and the kind of export restriction measures applied. These welfare losses could be very high when quantitative export restriction measures are applied when there is prohibitions on certain goods that have a low price elasticity of demand, or when there is export taxes on good with very high elasticity of demand. If supply is inelastic, export restrictions of supply increase the price of the good exported on a global level in the short run. However, in the long run, welfare losses will decrease because supply and demand curves will eventually adjust.

== Impact of food crises 2008 on export restriction measures ==
The food crises of 2008 affected the export restriction measures on both agricultural and non-agricultural commodities worldwide. These restrictions are changing terms of trade and causing welfare losses on both national and global levels. The reason behind these strict restrictions was related to food security and preventing food shortage. These export measures were a quantitative restriction on export (QRE) and tax on export.

An export restriction may be imposed:

- To prevent a shortage of goods in the domestic market because it is more profitable to export
- To manage the effect on the domestic market of the importing country, which may otherwise impose antidumping duties on the imported goods
- As part of foreign policy, for example as a component of trade sanctions
- To limit or restrict arms or dual-use items that may be used in proliferation, terrorism, or nuclear, chemical, or biological warfare.
- To limit or restrict trade to embargoed nations.

In the United States, the Export Administration Regulations are issued by the Bureau of Industry and Security (in the Department of Commerce) for all items except munitions. The Department of State has the responsibility of overseeing export of defense and military-related articles as per the International Traffic in Arms Regulations or ITAR.

== See also ==
- Export control
- Dual-use technology
