= Ricky L. Waddell =

American Army general (born 1959)

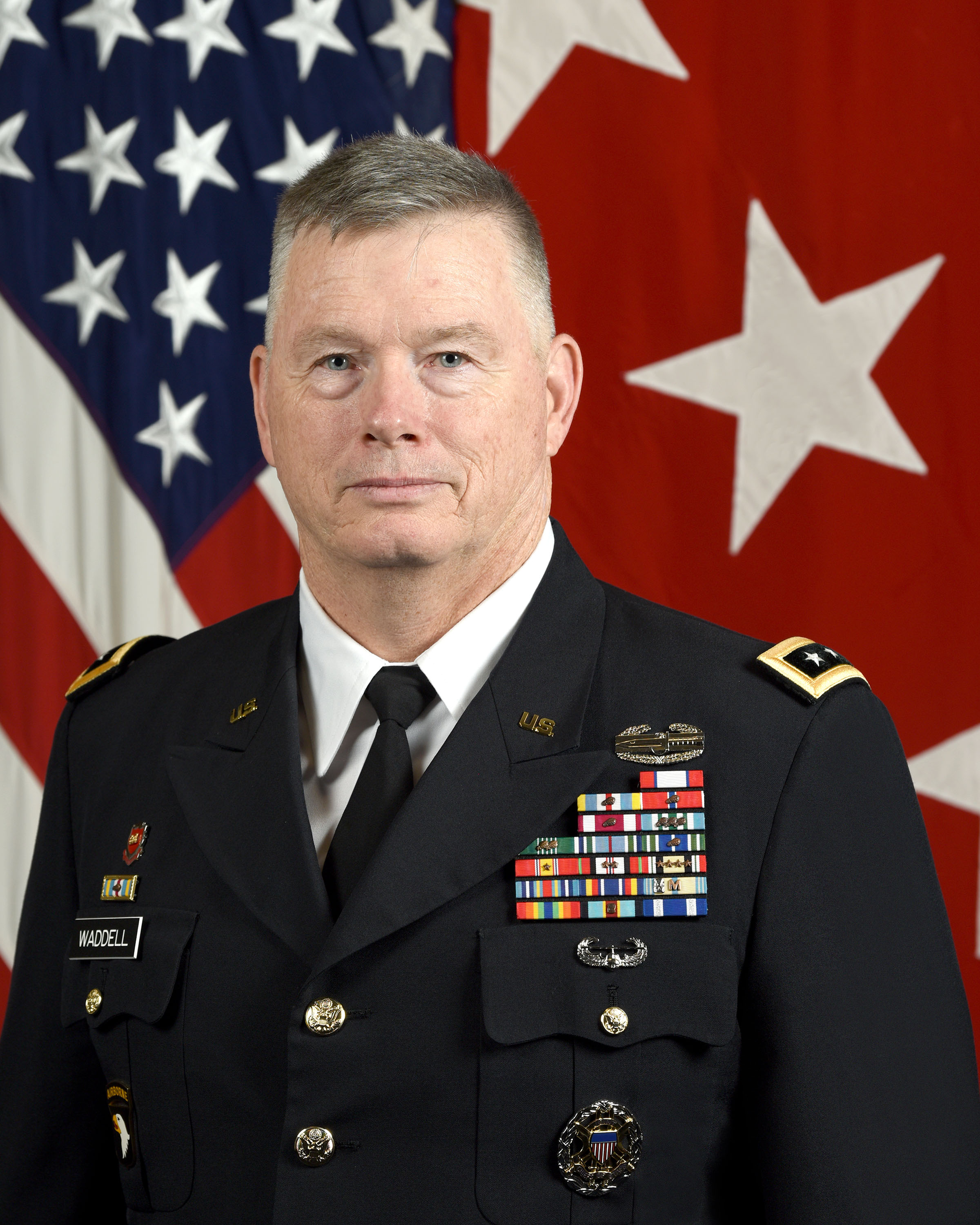

29th United States Deputy National Security Advisor
- In office May 19, 2017 – May 15, 2018
- President: Donald Trump
- Preceded by: K. T. McFarland
- Succeeded by: Mira Ricardel

Personal details
- Born: 31 October 1959 (age 66) Bentonville, Arkansas, U.S.
- Education: United States Military Academy (BS); Corpus Christi College, Oxford (BA); Webster University (MPA); Columbia University (PhD)

Military service
- Allegiance: United States
- Branch/service: United States Army Reserve
- Years of service: 1982–2021
- Rank: Lieutenant General
- Commands: 76th Operational Response Command; Combined Joint Interagency Task Force – Shafafiyat
- Battles/wars: War in Afghanistan; Iraq War
- Awards: Defense Distinguished Service Medal; Army Distinguished Service Medal; Defense Superior Service Medal (2); Bronze Star Medal (2)

Ricky Lynn Waddell (born 31 October 1959) is a retired lieutenant general in the United States Army Reserve who served as a Deputy National Security Advisor to President Donald Trump from 2017 to 2018 and as the Assistant to the Chairman of the Joint Chiefs of Staff from 2018 to 2021. His promotion to lieutenant general was authorized by the United States Senate on 26 September 2019. He retired from active military service in October 2021.

== Early life ==
Waddell attended the United States Military Academy, graduating in 1982 with a degree of Bachelor of Science.

== Military career ==
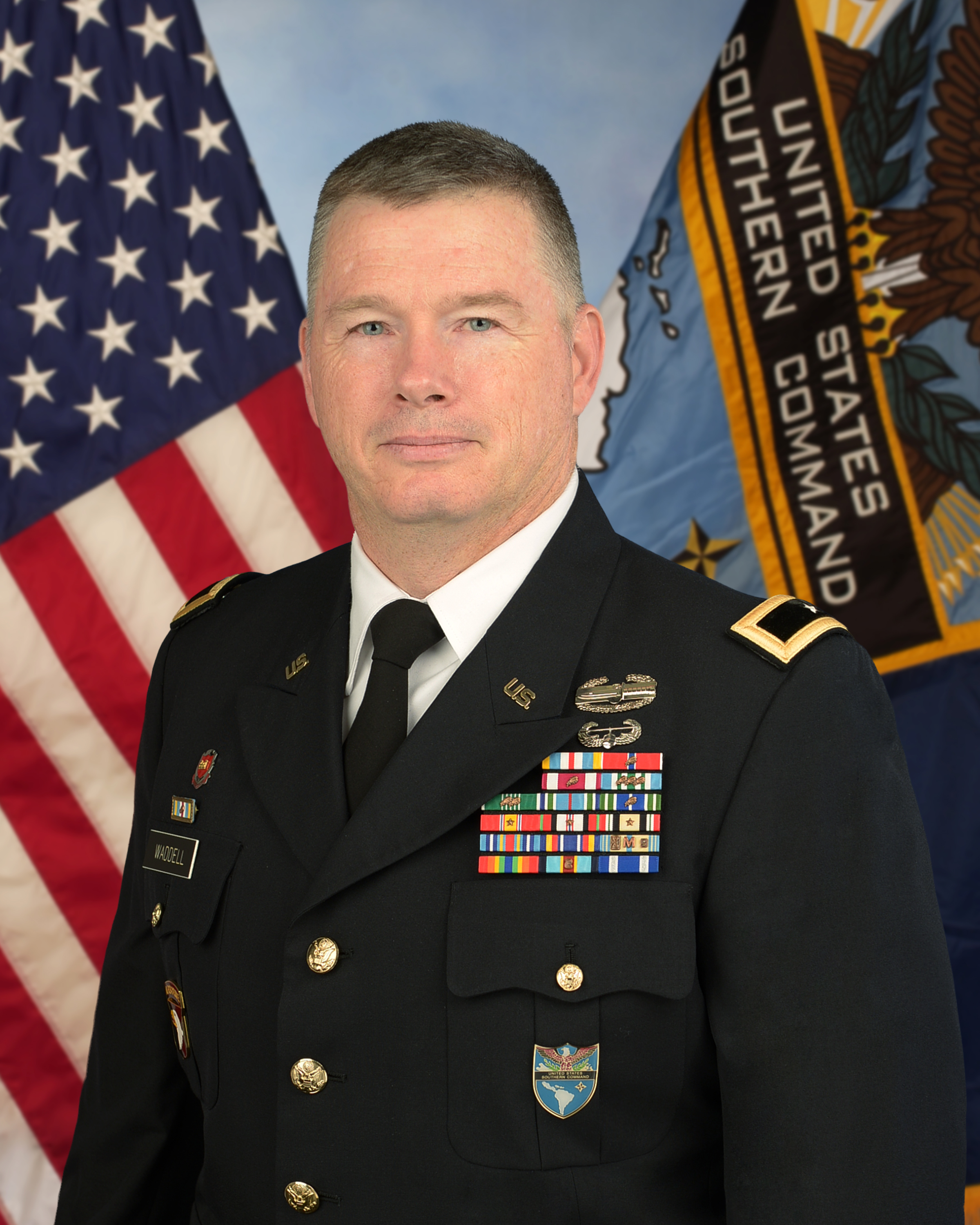
Wadell's official photo for the Southern Command

Waddell became an Engineer Officer with 15th Engineer Battalion, then the 9th Infantry Division as a Platoon Leader and Battalion Maintenance Officer. With Joint Task Force Bravo at Soto Cano (Palmerola) Air Base, Comayagua, Honduras, he served as the JTF Engineer. In the 35th Engineer Battalion, he served as the Commander C Company. He returned to the United States Military Academy as an instructor in the Department of Social Sciences. He subsequently served as Director for European Security Affairs on the National Security Council.

Waddell has been an Active Reserve officer, filling the following roles:

- Special Assistant at the Office of the Deputy Under Secretary of the Army;
- Deputy Commander for Mobilization and Reserve Affairs, United States Southern Command, Florida
- Energy Sector Strategic Analyst, United States Central Command
- Special Advisor, 101st Airborne Division (Air Assault), Tikrit, Iraq
- Joint Strategic Planner, Headquarters Multi-National Force – Iraq;
- Director of Oil, J9, United States Forces – Iraq
- J4 (operational support – wartime), United States Forces Korea
- Director, Combined Joint Interagency Task Force – Shafafiyat ("transparency"), NATO International Security Assistance Force, Kabul, Afghanistan (following H. R. McMaster)
- Commander, 76th Operational Response Command, Salt Lake City, Utah (Major General; assumed command, 17 October 2015)

A special retirement review was held for Waddell at Conmy Hall, Joint Base Myer-Henderson Hall on 13 August 2021. He is set to vacate his role as assistant to the Chairman of the Joint Chiefs of Staff at the end of September 2021, with his retirement effective on 1 October 2021.

== Civilian career ==
Waddell spent 17 years working in South America. His roles included Managing Director for South America, BG Group (oil and gas) and Chief Executive Officer, Anglo Ferrous Metals in Brazil. During this period, he lived for 12 years in Sao Paulo, Brazil.

Waddell ran the Keystone, Capstone, and Pinnacle programs as a civilian employee of the Department of Defense at the National Defense University, Washington, D.C.

== Deputy National Security Advisor ==
In early May 2017, Waddell was reportedly named as the White House's Deputy National Security Advisor, following K. T. McFarland, to serve under Lieutenant General H. R. McMaster, National Security Advisor. Waddell's appointment was blocked, initially, by White House Chief of Staff, Reince Priebus. The announcement was made official on 19 May 2017.

On 12 April 2018, the White House announced that Waddell would leave in the coming weeks. His departure happened shortly after John R. Bolton's appointment as National Security Advisor. Waddell was one of several officials who left at Bolton's request.

== Decorations and awards ==
U.S. military decorations
Defense Distinguished Service Medal
Army Distinguished Service Medal
Defense Superior Service Medal with Oak leaf cluster
Bronze Star Medal with Oak leaf cluster
Meritorious Service Medal with Oak leaf cluster
Joint Service Commendation Medal with three Oak leaf clusters
Army Commendation Medal with two Oak leaf cluster
Joint Service Achievement Medal
Army Achievement Medal with Oak leaf cluster

U.S. badges, patches and tabs
Combat Action Badge
Air Assault Badge

== Education ==
Waddell has received the following degrees:

- Bachelor of Science in Engineering – United States Military Academy
- Master of Public Administration – Webster University
- Bachelor of Arts in History and Portuguese – Corpus Christi College, Oxford as a Rhodes Scholar
- Doctor of Philosophy in International Relations – Columbia University

== Publications ==
Waddell has written four historical military books, dealing with his Latin America and Army experiences:

- Wars Then & Now
- In War's Shadow: Waging Peace in Central America
- The Army and Low Intensity Conflict
- In War's Shadow – At the Edge of the Cold War

Waddell has also published various journal articles, including:

- R. D. Hooker Jr. and Ricky L. Waddell, The Future of Conventional Deterrence, Naval War College Review, Summer 1992.

Government offices
Preceded by K. T. McFarland	Deputy National Security Advisor; 2017-2018	Succeeded by Mira Ricardel
Military offices
Preceded by Christopher W. Grady	Assistant to the Chairman of the Joint Chiefs of Staff; 2018-2021	Succeeded by Colin J. Kilrain
