= Alan Estevez =

American national security official

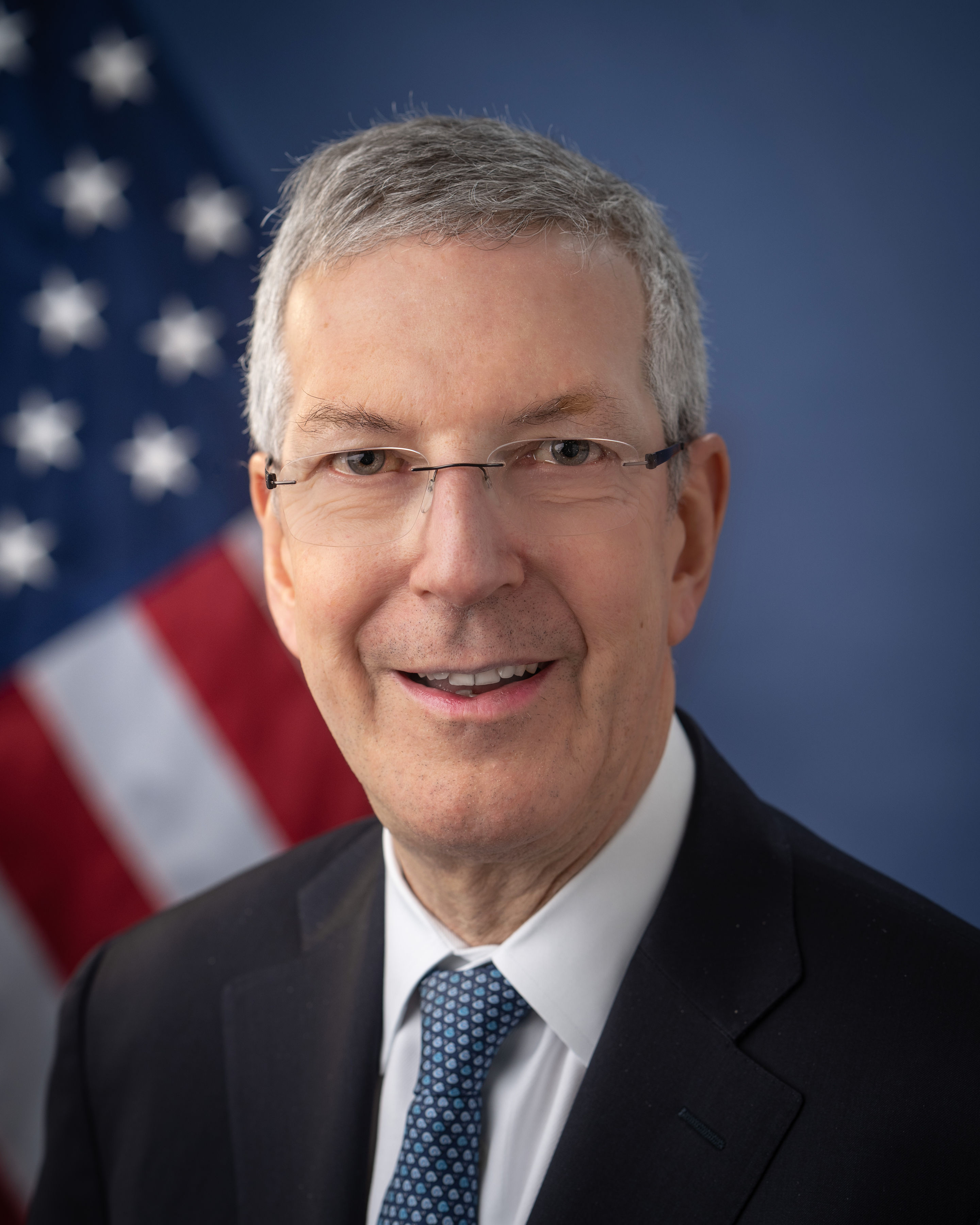

Under Secretary of Commerce for Industry and Security
- In office April 19, 2022 – January 20, 2025
- President: Joe Biden
- Preceded by: Mira Ricardel (2018)
- Succeeded by: Jeffrey I. Kessler

Assistant Secretary of Defense for Logistics and Materiel Readiness
- In office August 8, 2011 – October 30, 2013
- President: Barack Obama
- Preceded by: Phillip J. Bell (2009)
- Succeeded by: David J. Berteau

Personal details
- Education: Rutgers University (BA); National Defense University (MS)

Alan F. Estevez is an American national security official who served as Under Secretary of Commerce for Industry and Security in the Biden administration from 2022 to 2025.

== Education ==
Estevez holds a BA in political science from Rutgers University and a MS in national resource strategy from the Industrial College of the Armed Forces.

== Career ==
From 1981 to 2002, Estevez served in the Office of the Secretary of Defense, the United States Department of the Army, and the Military Surface Deployment and Distribution Command. During the Obama administration, Estevez served in the United States Department of Defense as Assistant Secretary of Defense for Logistics and Materiel Readiness and principal deputy under secretary of defense (acquisition, technology & logistics). He subsequently joined Deloitte as a national security and logistics consultant. In July 2021, President Joe Biden nominated Estevez to serve as Under Secretary of Commerce for Industry and Security. He was confirmed by the U.S. Senate on March 31 and sworn in on April 19, 2022.
