= Mira Ricardel =

American businesswoman and politician (born 1960)

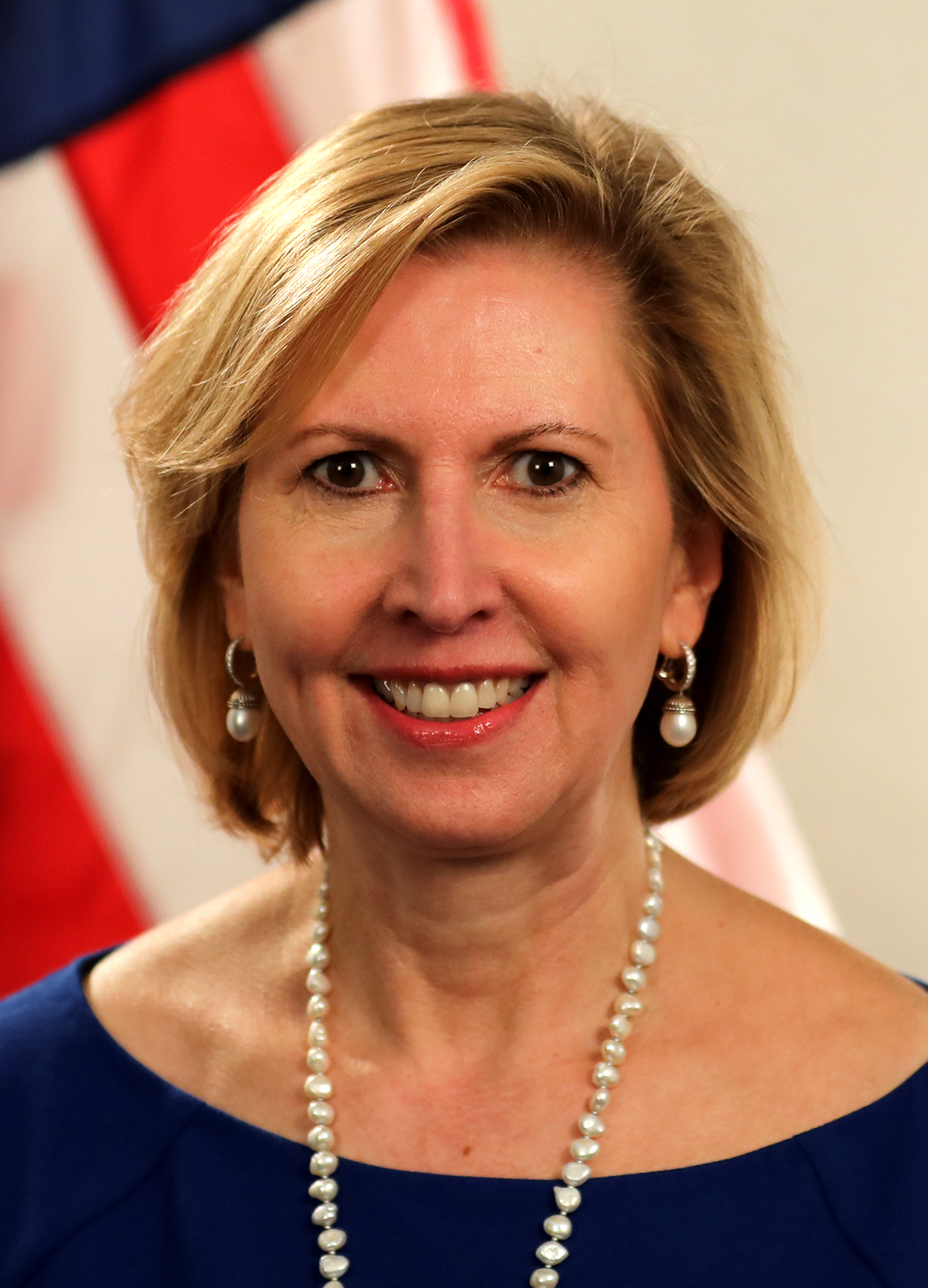
- Official portrait, 2017

30th United States Deputy National Security Advisor
- In office May 15, 2018 – November 14, 2018
- President: Donald Trump
- Preceded by: Ricky L. Waddell
- Succeeded by: Charles Kupperman

Under Secretary of Commerce for Industry and Security
- In office September 11, 2017 – May 14, 2018
- President: Donald Trump
- Preceded by: Eric Hirschhorn
- Succeeded by: Alan Estevez

Personal details
- Born: Mira P. Radielovic; July 5, 1960 (age 66) Milwaukee, Wisconsin, U.S.
- Party: Republican
- Spouses: Robert Baratta (divorced): Vincent Ricardel
- Education: Georgetown University (BS); Tufts University

Mira Radielovic Ricardel (formerly Baratta; born July 5, 1960), is an American businesswoman and former government official.

She is a board member of Titomic, an Australian manufacturing additive company listed on the Australian Securities Exchange.

She served as Deputy National Security Advisor from May 2018 to November 2018. Her controversial departure from the White House was largely billed as being "fired at the request of First Lady Melania Trump."

Earlier in the first Trump administration, Ricardel served as a Special Assistant to the President and Associate Director in the Office of Presidential Personnel, and Under Secretary of Commerce for Export Administration. In years prior to that, she served as a foreign policy advisor to U.S. Senator Bob Dole and held positions in the U.S. Department of Defense during the presidency of George W. Bush.

== Early life and education ==
Born Mira P. Radielovic in Milwaukee, Wisconsin, Ricardel is of German and Croatian descent. Her father, Peter Radielovic, came from Breza, Bosnia and Herzegovina. He was 16 years old when he survived the Bleiburg repatriations. After briefly attending Zagreb University, he left Yugoslavia in 1954. After two years in Heidelberg, where he met and married his wife, he arrived in the United States in 1956.

Ricardel grew up in Pasadena, California, and at home spoke the German and Croatian languages. Her family belonged to the St Anthony's Croatian Catholic Church and attended Mass in Los Angeles.

Ricardel received her Bachelor of Science (B.S.) in Foreign Service from Georgetown University, graduating magna cum laude in 1982 and received honors in Russian Studies. While at Georgetown, she was a member of the Delta Phi Epsilon professional foreign service sorority.

She then did doctoral coursework at the Fletcher School of Law and Diplomacy at Tufts University, but did not complete her degree.

== Career ==
Ricardel's public service began in 1984, when she was selected for the distinguished Presidential Management Intern Program (now Presidential Management Fellow Program) where she rotated into positions at the Defense Logistics Agency, the Defense Security Cooperation Agency, and the Office of Senator Pete Wilson (R-CA).

Politically, Ricardel has characterized herself as a "Reagan Republican". Her first political appointment was in 1986, working at the Arms Control and Disarmament Agency where she served as a congressional affairs specialist and later as a deputy director for congressional affairs. She served at the agency until 1989.

=== Aide to Dole ===
From 1989 to 1996, Ricardel worked as a legislative assistant to Senate Republican leader Bob Dole, drafting legislation and specializing in foreign affairs and defense policy. She made appearances in public, and her work with Dole earned her a portrayal in the nationally circulated Weekly Standard in 1995. During the Bosnian War between 1992 and 1995, her personal knowledge of the languages and cultures involved was credited with improving Dole's understanding of the conflict. One official said, "She knows the issues, so he knows the issues."

Ricardel's Croatian heritage brought forth accusations that she was influencing Dole to take an anti-Serbian policy stance. But in fact Dole had a long record of warning about the actions and character of Serbia leader Slobodan Milosevic. Ricardel said of Dole in 1999, "He's been out there for a decade saying we need to get involved. And no one's been paying attention. Or they pay attention for a while and manage the problem, but they don't solve it."

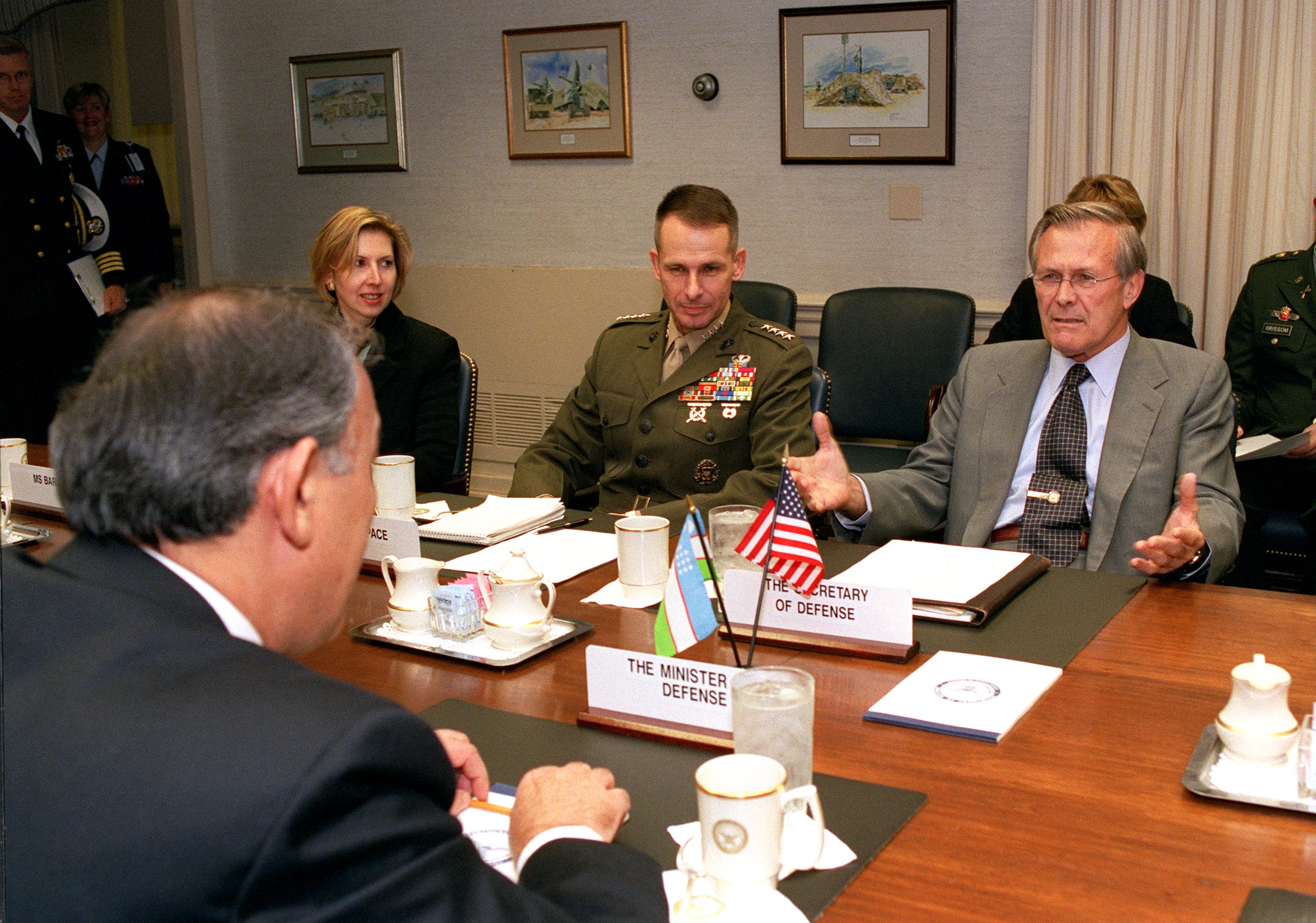
Then known as Mira Baratta, in a defense-related meeting in 2001

Ricardel served as an advisor on defense and foreign policy on Dole's 1996 presidential campaign, when he won the Republican nomination but lost the general election to Bill Clinton.

=== Freedom House ===
Ricardel served as a vice president for programming with the nonprofit organization Freedom House from 1997 to 1998 and as an independent consultant from 1998 to 2000. During some of this time she lived in New York City and was a close neighbor of Monica Lewinsky.

=== George W. Bush administration ===
From 2001 to 2003, Ricardel was Deputy Assistant Secretary of Defense for Eurasia and was responsible for coalition building between the U.S. and governments in the Caucasus, Central Asian, and Balkans regions.

From 2003 to 2005, Ricardel was the Principal Deputy Assistant Secretary of Defense for International Security Policy and then acting Assistant Secretary of Defense for International Security Policy. She was the primary adviser to the U.S. Secretary of Defense regarding Europe, Eurasia, NATO, nuclear forces, missile defense, and arms control.

The Washington Post reported that "She developed a reputation as a Russia hawk and was seen as a tough bureaucratic player with a strong personality". One former colleague later said, "She’s a very tough woman, very smart, does not suffer fools well. And if you happen to be the fool, she will let you know".

=== Private sector ===
After leaving the Defense Department, Ricardel spent one year as Vice President of International Business Development for Teachscape, a company that creates educational training and support.

From 2006 to 2015, Ricardel was employed by the Boeing Company as Vice President, Strategic Missile & Defense Systems, as well as Vice President of International Business Development, Network and Space Systems. During her time with Boeing she was a resident of Alexandria, Virginia.

In 2015, Ricardel joined Federal Budget IQ as a consultant. Despite the orientation of its work, that of an involved governmental research firm, she was not considered a registered lobbyist.

=== Donald Trump administration ===
==== Transition ====
Ricardel was part of Donald Trump's 2016 presidential transition team as a Department of Defense advisor leading the DOD Transition Team.

Ricardel was looked at for positions in the new administration in the Defense and State Departments, but was twice blocked based upon past bureaucratic run-ins, in the first instance by Secretary of Defense James Mattis and in the second by Department of State Chief of Staff Margaret Peterlin. Ricardel had blocked some nominees wanted by Mattis because of potential Democratic ties or having supported Hillary Clinton in the past, instead preferring "Republican loyalists."

==== Under Secretary of Commerce for Industry and Security ====
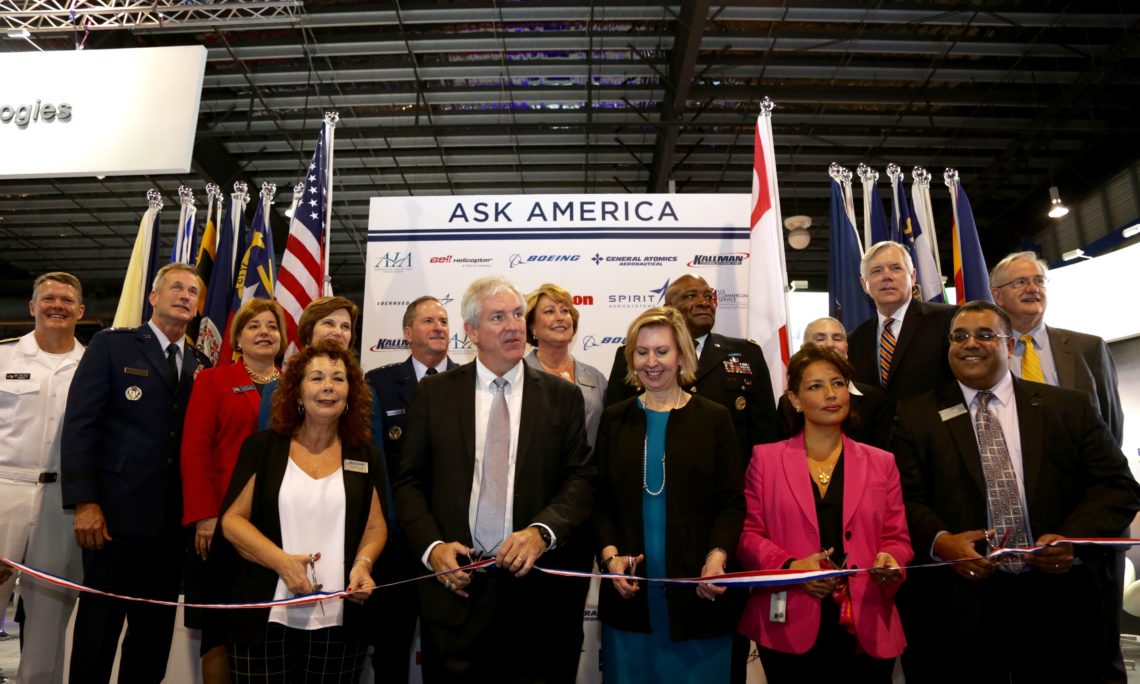
Under Secretary Ricardel (front, right of center) at the USA Partnership Pavilion ribbon cutting at the Singapore Airshow in February 2018

On March 30, 2017, President Trump announced his intent to nominate Ricardel for Under Secretary of Commerce for Industry and Security in the U.S. Department of Commerce. On April 28, 2017, Ricardel's nomination was received in the Senate and referred to the Committee on Banking, Housing, and Urban Affairs. The committee approved her nomination and she was confirmed by the entire U.S. Senate on August 3, 2017, by voice vote.

==== Deputy National Security Advisor ====
On April 23, 2018, Ricardel was named as the next Deputy National Security Advisor by the new National Security Advisor, John R. Bolton. She replaced Major General Rick Waddell and took office in May without requiring Senate confirmation.

Ricardel's appointment received bipartisan support, including this statement from Arnold L. Punaro, former Staff Director of the Senate Armed Services Committee. Punaro praised Ricardel's inclusive approach, keen intellect, and excellent judgement and expressed confidence in her ability to run the Deputies Committee with shrewdness and dexterity. Commerce Secretary Wilbur Ross also congratulated Mira Ricardel on her new position.

One of Ricardel's first actions was to push for the elimination of the position of White House cybersecurity chief on May 15, 2018. This move was defended by White House officials referring to Alexander Hamilton in Federalist No. 70 but criticized by many in the cybersecurity community.

In July 2018, reported difficulties between Ricardel and NSC staffer Jennifer Arangio led to Arangio's dismissal. Despite past conflicts, the White House said Ricardel was working effectively with the Defense Department. However, subsequent reports in September 2018 indicated that conflicts between Ricardel and Defense Secretary Mattis were still present, while other reports said that the conflict between the two had been overblown. Ricardel continued to be portrayed in the media as a tough bureaucratic opponent.

On November 13, 2018, a statement made by First Lady Melania Trump spokesperson publicly called for Ricardel's firing following a dispute over personnel presence on the plane for the First Lady's visit to Africa. Bolton supported Ricardel but few other officials did. Bloomberg News reported that Ricardel "had caused friction" and was "widely disliked among other White House staff." The following day, the White House announced Ricardel would leave her position.

==== Subsequent developments ====
By mid-November, Ricardel had reportedly been offered nearly a dozen other positions within the Trump administration, including the post of United States Ambassador to Estonia, which she refused. In January 2019, Fox News reported that she was "under active consideration for a top job at the Pentagon"; that did not happen. Since November 2019, Ricardel has served as Principal of The Chertoff Group, a security consulting firm founded by former Secretary of Homeland Security Michael Chertoff and Chad Sweet.

== Memberships, awards, and honors ==
In July 2005, Ricardel was awarded the Department of Defense Medal for Distinguished Public Service.

Ricardel has been a member of the Council on Foreign Relations since 1999. She was one of the youngest professionals ever inducted and was nominated by former ambassador to the United Nations Jeane Kirkpatrick.

== Personal life ==
While at the Fletcher School, she met Robert Baratta, who has been involved in aspects of Virginia politics and the federal government. They married and she became known as Mira Baratta.

After her marriage to Baratta ended, she married Vincent Ricardel, a photographer. She became known as Mira Ricardel. From 2017 to 2021, her husband served as Senior Advisor to the Chairman of the National Endowment for the Humanities.

== Publications ==
- Ricardel, Mira (June 27, 2022). "Wrap Up the CHIPS Act". Nextgov.com.
- Lord, Ellen; Ricardel, Mira (February 11, 2022). "America needs a robust, resilient supply chain for semiconductors". Defense News.
- Ricardel, Mira (January 20, 2020). "These new rules might end tech's reliance on Chinese investors". Fortune.
- Ricardel, Mira (September 30, 2015). "America needs a global missile defense plan". The Hill.
