= Demand vacuum =

Demand vacuum in economics and marketing is the effect created by consumer demand on the supply chain. The term refers to an analogy whereby consumer demand for a product or service creates a "vacuum" at the end of the supply chain which "pulls" the product through the chain by causing the suppliers to provide more product.

The marketing strategy of pull strategy aims to create a demand vacuum through advertising and promotion to the consumer. This is to be compared with push strategy that tries to push the product through the supply chain by promoting the product to sellers and encouraging them to carry it.

== Local shortages ==
A demand vacuum can cause a local shortage of a product when local demand is far exceeded by demand in export markets. The result is little or no availability of a product in its originating market.

== See also ==
- Demand patterns
