= Export =

Goods produced in one country that are sold to another country

Value of exported goods and services

An export in international trade is a good produced in one country that is sold into another country or a service provided in one country for a national or resident of another country. The seller of such goods or the service provider is an exporter; the foreign buyer is an importer. Services that figure in international trade include financial, accounting and other professional services, tourism, education as well as intellectual property rights.

Exportation of goods often requires the involvement of customs authorities.

== Firms ==
Exporting is one way in which a business can grow. Business's global expansion strategies may include:

- Franchising,
- Turn Key Project,
- Export,
- Joint Venture,
- Licensing,
- Creating an owned subsidiary,
- Acquisition,
- Merger, etc.

Exporting is mostly a strategy used by product based companies. Many manufacturing firms begin their global expansion as exporters and only later switch to another mode for serving a foreign market.

== Barriers ==
There are four main types of export barriers: motivational, informational, operational/resource-based, and knowledge.

Trade barriers are laws, regulations, policy, or practices that protect domestically made products from foreign competition. While restrictive business practices sometimes have a similar effect, they are not usually regarded as trade barriers. The most common foreign trade barriers are government-imposed measures and policies that restrict, prevent, or impede the international exchange of goods and services.

=== Strategic ===
International agreements limit trade-in and the transfer of certain types of goods and information, e.g., goods associated with weapons of mass destruction, advanced telecommunications, arms and torture and also some art and archaeological artifacts. For example:

- Nuclear Suppliers Group limits trade in nuclear weapons and associated goods (45 countries participate).
- The Australia Group limits trade in chemical and biological weapons and associated goods (39 countries).
- Missile Technology Control Regime limits trade in the means of delivering weapons of mass destruction (35 countries).
- The Wassenaar Arrangement limits trade in conventional arms and technological developments (40 countries).

Although the outbreak of COVID-19 sufficiently changed the world economy, people started doing business, so international trade is a key for economic growth. Armenia's economy is dependent on international flows, tourism, and inner production. Competitive export Industries were established which helped the growth of Gross Domestic Product (GDP) to generate financial resources. The market shifted to more efficient exporters, which is the effect of trade liberalization on aggregate productivity. Due to the increase of the number of international business activities through a multilateral trading system, RA Government Program, which was approved in February 2019, the government policy became the objective of economic growth. The period established for the program was 2019-2024. Export quality is developed by developing the export volumes and services.

=== Tariffs ===
Tariffs, a tax on a specific good or category of goods exported from or imported to a country, is an economic barrier to trade. A tariff increases the cost of imported or exported goods, and may be used when domestic producers are having difficulty competing with imports. Tariffs may also be used to protect an industry viewed as being of national security concern. Some industries receive protection that has a similar effect to subsidies; tariffs reduce the industry's incentives to produce goods quicker, cheaper, and more efficiently, becoming ever less competitive.

The third basis for a tariff involves dumping. When a producer exports at a loss, its competitors may term this dumping. Another case is when the exporter prices a good lower in the export market than in its domestic market. The purpose and expected outcome of a tariff is to encourage spending on domestic goods and services rather than their imported equivalents.

Tariffs may create tension between countries, such as the United States steel tariff in 2002, and when China placed a 14% tariff on imported auto parts. Such tariffs may lead to a complaint with the World Trade Organization (WTO) which sets rules and attempts to resolve trade disputes. If that is unsatisfactory, the exporting country may choose to put a tariff of its own on imports from the other country.

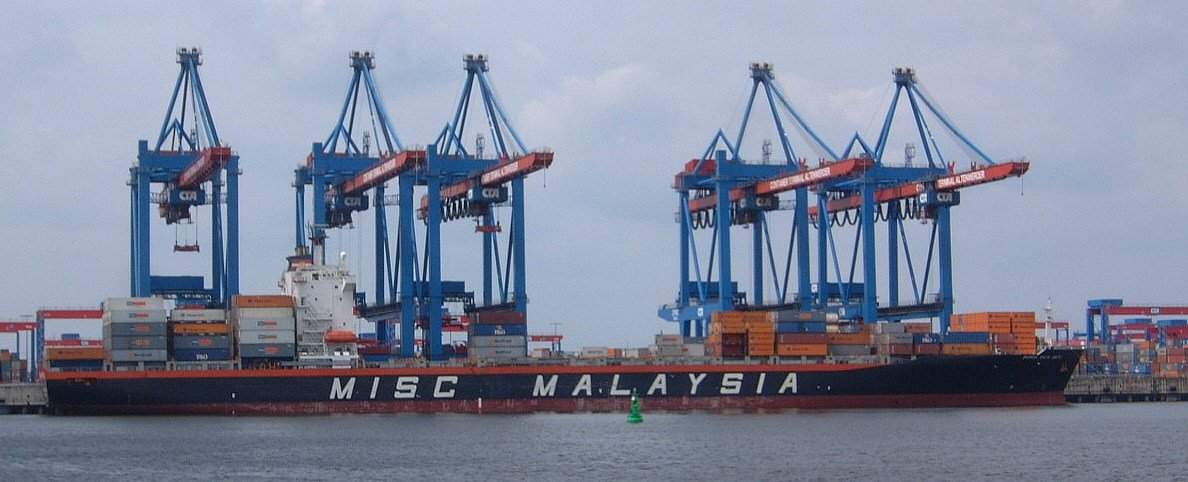
Vessel at Altenwerder Container Terminal (Hamburg)

== Advantages ==
Exporting avoids the cost of establishing manufacturing operations in the target country.

Exporting may help a company achieve experience curve effects and location economies in their home country. Ownership advantages include the firm's assets, international experience, and the ability to develop either low-cost or differentiated products. The locational advantages of a particular market are a combination of costs, market potential and investment risk. Internationalization advantages are the benefits of retaining a core competence within the company and threading it though the value chain rather than to license, outsource, or sell it.

In relation to the eclectic paradigm, companies with meager ownership advantages do not enter foreign markets. If the company and its products are equipped with ownership advantage and internalization advantage, they enter through low-risk modes such as exporting. Exporting requires significantly less investment than other modes, such as direct investment. Export's lower risk typically reduces the rate of return on sales versus other modes. Exporting allows managers to exercise production control, but does not provide them the option to exercise as much marketing control. An exporter enlists various intermediaries to manage marketing management and marketing activities. Exports also has effect on the Economy. Businesses export goods and services where they have a competitive advantage. This means they are better than any other country at providing that product or have a natural ability to produce either due to their climate or geographical location etc.

== Disadvantages ==
Exporting may not be viable unless appropriate locations can be found abroad.

High transport costs can make exporting uneconomical, particularly for bulk products.

Another drawback is that trade barriers can make exporting uneconomical and risky.

For small and medium-sized enterprises (SMEs) with fewer than 250 employees, export is generally more difficult than serving the domestic market. The lack of knowledge of trade regulations, cultural differences, different languages and foreign-exchange situations, as well as the strain of resources and staff, complicate the process. Two-thirds of SME exporters pursue only one foreign market.

Another disadvantage is the dependency on almost unpredictable exchange rates. The depreciation of foreign currency badly affects exporters. For example, Armenia exports different things - from foodstuff to software. In 2022, the country had an enormous number of Russian visitors and tourists because of the military situation in Russia. This resulted in a change in exchange rates and the appreciation of the Armenian dram. At first, it may seem that Armenia’s economy is growing. In fact, the GDP growth is expected to hit 7% by the IMF. However, exporters, who export products and get paid mostly in dollars, suffer because of the depreciation of the dollar against the Armenian dram. Moreover, Armenia’s other exporting bright spot is the IT industry, since a lot of companies and individuals work for US-based companies and get paid in US dollars. Because of the drastic change in the exchange rates, these people and companies who export their service to the US or other countries and get paid in US dollars, make around 25% less revenue.

Exports could also devalue a local currency to lower export prices. It could also lead to imposition of tariffs on imported goods.

== Motivations ==
The variety of export motivators can lead to selection bias. Size, knowledge of foreign markets, and unsolicited orders motivate firms to along specific dimensions (research, external, reactive).

== Macroeconomics ==
In macroeconomics, net exports (exports minus imports) are a component of gross domestic product, along with domestic consumption, physical investment, and government spending. Foreign demand for a country's exports depends positively on income in foreign countries and negatively on the strength of the producing country's currency (i.e., on how expensive it is for foreign customers to buy the producing country's currency in the foreign exchange market).

== See also ==
- Comparative advantage
- Commodity currency
- Commodity Classification Automated Tracking System
- Demand vacuum
- E-commerce
- Embargo
- Export-oriented industrialization
- Export control
- Export performance
- Export promotion
- Export strategy
- Export subsidy
- Export Yellow Pages
- Free trade
- Free trade agreement
- Free trade area
- Import
- Infant industry argument
- International trade
- List of countries by exports
- Protectionism
- Sales
- Trade barrier
  - Tariff
  - Non-tariff barriers to trade
