= Charles Kupperman =

American government official (born 1950)

- Kupperman in 1987

31st United States Deputy National Security Advisor
- In office January 11, 2019 – September 22, 2019
- President: Donald Trump
- Preceded by: Mira Ricardel
- Succeeded by: Matthew Pottinger

Acting United States National Security Advisor
- In office September 10, 2019 – September 18, 2019
- President: Donald Trump
- Preceded by: John R. Bolton
- Succeeded by: Robert O'Brien

Personal details
- Born: Charles Martin Kupperman; November 9, 1950 (age 75)
- Party: Republican
- Spouse: Judie Kupperman
- Children: 3
- Education: Purdue University (BA); University of British Columbia (MA); University of Southern California (PhD)

Charles Martin Kupperman (born November 9, 1950) is a former United States Deputy National Security Advisor for President Donald Trump, a position he held from January to September 2019. He also was the acting United States National Security Advisor for eight days in September 2019 between John Bolton and Robert C. O'Brien.

== Early life and education ==
Kupperman graduated from Waukegan High School in 1968, where he played varsity baseball; his parents owned a paint factory in Waukegan.

Kupperman earned a bachelor's degree in political science from Purdue University in 1972. He received a master's degree in international relations from the University of British Columbia in 1973. His master's thesis was entitled Strategy, Technology and the Making of United States Strategic Doctrines 1945–1972. Kupperman completed a doctorate in strategic studies at the University of Southern California in 1980. His doctoral thesis was entitled The SALT II Debate, and supervised by William Van Cleave.

== Career ==
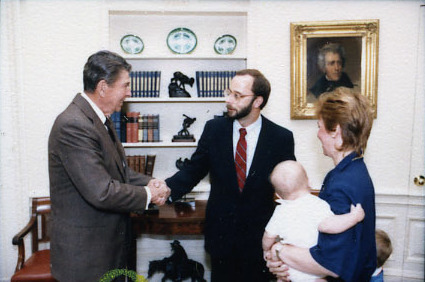
Kupperman greeting President Ronald Reagan in 1987

From 1978 to 1980, Kupperman was the senior defense analyst for the Committee on the Present Danger.

In 1980, Kupperman was a foreign policy adviser to Ronald Reagan's presidential campaign. After Reagan was elected, Kupperman joined the Reagan administration. He was executive assistant to the acting administrator of the National Aeronautics and Space Administration, beginning in December 1985, and then the Executive Director of the General Advisory Committee on Arms Control of the U.S. Arms Control and Disarmament Agency, before becoming the executive assistant to the director of the Office of Personnel Management. In July 1986 he became special assistant to the president and deputy director of the Office of Administration.

In 1991, Kupperman became the president and chief executive of Xsirius Superconductivity, a small Arlington, Virginia company developing commercial applications for high-temperature superconductivity technology.

Kupperman also worked at two defense contractors, Lockheed Martin and Boeing; he was the vice president for business development for missile defense systems for Boeing and the vice president of Washington Space Operations for Lockheed Martin Corporation. He retired from Boeing in July 2006, after six years.

From 2001 to 2010, Kupperman was on the board of directors for the Center for Security Policy. In late 2014, he was the treasurer of the Bolton for New Hampshire PAC.

In April 2018, after Bolton was chosen to be the national security advisor, Kupperman took a temporary leadership post on the National Security Council. In January 2019, he became the deputy national security advisor, replacing Mira Ricardel, who had left that position in mid-November 2018. On September 10, 2019, when John Bolton departed from his position of United States national security advisor, Kupperman was made acting United States national security advisor. The Council on American Islamic Relations said that it was "appalled" by Kupperman's appointment because of the Center for Security Policy's record of anti-Islam statements.

With the appointment of Robert O'Brien on September 18, he was removed as acting national security advisor; he was replaced as deputy national security advisor four days later, on September 22, with Matt Pottinger.

=== Trump-Ukraine scandal ===
Kupperman was on the July 25 call when President Trump allegedly pressured Ukrainian President Zelensky to investigate the Bidens. Kupperman was scheduled to testify on October 28, 2019, before three House committees handling the impeachment inquiry against Donald Trump with respect to the Trump-Ukraine scandal. The Trump administration, through White House counsel Pat Cipollone, directed Kupperman in writing not to comply with the House subpoena claiming "constitutional immunity" would protect him. Subsequently, Kupperman filed a lawsuit asking a federal judge to decide whether or not he must comply with the House subpoena or the Trump Administration's request to not testify. Kupperman's lawyer argued that he is faced with "irreconcilable commands" between the legislative and executive branches of government which can only be decided by the judicial branch. Due to the withdrawal of the House subpoena, on December 30, 2019, Judge Richard J. Leon dismissed Charles M. Kupperman v United States House of Representatives, et al., over the plaintiff's objections that he was still exposed to contempt, arrest, and fines from reissued subpoenas even though the House's lawyers had made promises not to do so.

== Personal life ==
Kupperman is Jewish. His wife Judie also graduated from Waukegan Township High School. He and his wife have three children.

Political offices
| Preceded by John R. Bolton | National Security Advisor; Acting; 2019 | Succeeded by Robert O'Brien |
