= Economics of location =

In economics, the economics of location is the study of strategies used by firms and retails in a monopolistically competitive environment in determining where to locate. Unlike a product differentiation strategy, where firms make their products different in order to attract customers, an economics of location strategy is consistent with firms producing similar or identical products.

The economics of location refers to the study of the factors that influence the location of economic activity and the spatial distribution of economic phenomena. This includes the study of how businesses and industries choose where to locate, how the location of economic activity affects the local economy and society, and how government policies and other factors can influence the location of economic activity.

One important factor that influences the location of economic activity is access to inputs such as labor, capital, and raw materials. Businesses and industries tend to locate in areas where these inputs are abundant and inexpensive, as this can help to reduce production costs and increase profits. For example, a manufacturing company may choose to locate near a large pool of skilled labor, or a resource-based industry such as mining or forestry may choose to locate near sources of raw materials.

Another important factor is access to markets. Businesses and industries tend to locate in areas where they can easily sell their products or services to consumers or other businesses. This may include locating near large population centers, or in areas with good transportation infrastructure.

== See also ==
- Hotelling's law
