= Jeffrey I. Kessler =

American lawyer

Jeffrey Kessler
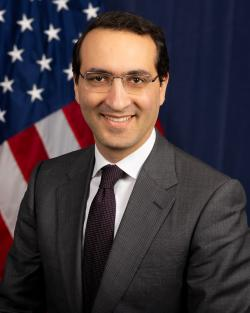
- Official portrait, 2025

Under Secretary of Commerce for Industry and Security
- Incumbent
- Assumed office March 20, 2025
- President: Donald Trump
- Preceded by: Alan Estevez

Assistant Secretary of Commerce for Enforcement and Compliance
- In office April 11, 2019 – January 20, 2021
- President: Donald J. Trump
- Succeeded by: Lisa Wang

Personal details
- Education: Yale University (BA); University of Chicago (MA); Stanford University (MA, JD)

Jeffrey Ian Kessler is an American lawyer currently serving as Under Secretary of Commerce for Industry and Security in the second Trump administration. He previously was a partner in WilmerHale's International Trade Practice and served as Assistant Secretary of Commerce for Enforcement and Compliance during the first Trump presidency.

== Education ==
Kessler holds a BA from Yale, an MA from the University of Chicago, and an MA and JD from Stanford.

== Career ==
Kessler rejoined WilmerHale after serving as Assistant Secretary of Commerce for Enforcement and Compliance in January 2021.

In early February 2025, Trump nominated Kessler to serve as Under Secretary of Commerce for Industry and Security in his second administration. He was confirmed by the U.S. Senate on March 13, 2025.
